

601001–601100 

|-bgcolor=#E9E9E9
| 601001 ||  || — || October 6, 2012 || Mount Lemmon || Mount Lemmon Survey ||  || align=right | 1.2 km || 
|-id=002 bgcolor=#E9E9E9
| 601002 ||  || — || October 7, 2012 || Haleakala || Pan-STARRS ||  || align=right | 1.3 km || 
|-id=003 bgcolor=#d6d6d6
| 601003 ||  || — || October 15, 2012 || Mount Lemmon || Mount Lemmon Survey ||  || align=right | 2.7 km || 
|-id=004 bgcolor=#fefefe
| 601004 ||  || — || October 8, 2012 || Haleakala || Pan-STARRS || H || align=right data-sort-value="0.49" | 490 m || 
|-id=005 bgcolor=#E9E9E9
| 601005 ||  || — || October 8, 2012 || Mount Lemmon || Mount Lemmon Survey ||  || align=right | 1.2 km || 
|-id=006 bgcolor=#d6d6d6
| 601006 ||  || — || October 8, 2012 || Mount Lemmon || Mount Lemmon Survey ||  || align=right | 2.3 km || 
|-id=007 bgcolor=#C2FFFF
| 601007 ||  || — || October 11, 2012 || Mount Lemmon || Mount Lemmon Survey || L5 || align=right | 5.3 km || 
|-id=008 bgcolor=#E9E9E9
| 601008 ||  || — || October 11, 2012 || Mount Lemmon || Mount Lemmon Survey ||  || align=right | 1.6 km || 
|-id=009 bgcolor=#E9E9E9
| 601009 ||  || — || October 10, 2012 || Kitt Peak || Spacewatch ||  || align=right | 1.8 km || 
|-id=010 bgcolor=#E9E9E9
| 601010 ||  || — || October 9, 2012 || Mount Lemmon || Mount Lemmon Survey ||  || align=right | 1.3 km || 
|-id=011 bgcolor=#E9E9E9
| 601011 ||  || — || October 8, 2012 || Haleakala || Pan-STARRS ||  || align=right | 1.5 km || 
|-id=012 bgcolor=#E9E9E9
| 601012 ||  || — || September 18, 2012 || Kitt Peak || Spacewatch ||  || align=right data-sort-value="0.70" | 700 m || 
|-id=013 bgcolor=#E9E9E9
| 601013 ||  || — || November 7, 2008 || Mount Lemmon || Mount Lemmon Survey ||  || align=right data-sort-value="0.91" | 910 m || 
|-id=014 bgcolor=#d6d6d6
| 601014 ||  || — || September 23, 2012 || Kitt Peak || Spacewatch ||  || align=right | 1.8 km || 
|-id=015 bgcolor=#E9E9E9
| 601015 ||  || — || October 16, 2012 || Mount Lemmon || Mount Lemmon Survey ||  || align=right | 1.8 km || 
|-id=016 bgcolor=#E9E9E9
| 601016 ||  || — || October 19, 2003 || Apache Point || SDSS Collaboration ||  || align=right | 1.8 km || 
|-id=017 bgcolor=#E9E9E9
| 601017 ||  || — || October 28, 2008 || Kitt Peak || Spacewatch ||  || align=right | 1.2 km || 
|-id=018 bgcolor=#E9E9E9
| 601018 ||  || — || November 7, 2008 || Mount Lemmon || Mount Lemmon Survey ||  || align=right | 1.1 km || 
|-id=019 bgcolor=#E9E9E9
| 601019 ||  || — || October 16, 2012 || Mount Lemmon || Mount Lemmon Survey ||  || align=right | 1.5 km || 
|-id=020 bgcolor=#d6d6d6
| 601020 ||  || — || September 17, 2012 || Nogales || M. Schwartz, P. R. Holvorcem ||  || align=right | 2.8 km || 
|-id=021 bgcolor=#d6d6d6
| 601021 ||  || — || October 17, 2012 || Piszkesteto || K. Sárneczky ||  || align=right | 2.4 km || 
|-id=022 bgcolor=#E9E9E9
| 601022 ||  || — || October 18, 2012 || Haleakala || Pan-STARRS || PAD || align=right | 1.4 km || 
|-id=023 bgcolor=#d6d6d6
| 601023 ||  || — || March 1, 2009 || Kitt Peak || Spacewatch ||  || align=right | 2.9 km || 
|-id=024 bgcolor=#E9E9E9
| 601024 ||  || — || September 16, 2003 || Kitt Peak || Spacewatch ||  || align=right | 1.7 km || 
|-id=025 bgcolor=#E9E9E9
| 601025 ||  || — || September 23, 2003 || Palomar || NEAT ||  || align=right | 1.4 km || 
|-id=026 bgcolor=#fefefe
| 601026 ||  || — || September 23, 2012 || Mount Lemmon || Mount Lemmon Survey || NYS || align=right data-sort-value="0.45" | 450 m || 
|-id=027 bgcolor=#E9E9E9
| 601027 ||  || — || October 8, 2012 || Kitt Peak || Spacewatch ||  || align=right | 1.1 km || 
|-id=028 bgcolor=#d6d6d6
| 601028 ||  || — || October 19, 2012 || Mount Lemmon || Mount Lemmon Survey ||  || align=right | 2.9 km || 
|-id=029 bgcolor=#d6d6d6
| 601029 ||  || — || December 5, 2007 || Kitt Peak || Spacewatch ||  || align=right | 2.2 km || 
|-id=030 bgcolor=#E9E9E9
| 601030 ||  || — || October 19, 2012 || Haleakala || Pan-STARRS ||  || align=right | 2.2 km || 
|-id=031 bgcolor=#E9E9E9
| 601031 ||  || — || August 22, 2003 || Palomar || NEAT ||  || align=right | 1.2 km || 
|-id=032 bgcolor=#fefefe
| 601032 ||  || — || October 27, 2008 || Mount Lemmon || Mount Lemmon Survey ||  || align=right data-sort-value="0.63" | 630 m || 
|-id=033 bgcolor=#E9E9E9
| 601033 ||  || — || May 24, 2011 || Haleakala || Pan-STARRS ||  || align=right | 2.1 km || 
|-id=034 bgcolor=#E9E9E9
| 601034 ||  || — || September 25, 2003 || Palomar || NEAT ||  || align=right | 1.5 km || 
|-id=035 bgcolor=#E9E9E9
| 601035 ||  || — || May 26, 2006 || Mount Lemmon || Mount Lemmon Survey ||  || align=right | 2.3 km || 
|-id=036 bgcolor=#E9E9E9
| 601036 ||  || — || October 21, 2012 || Piszkesteto || G. Hodosán ||  || align=right | 1.3 km || 
|-id=037 bgcolor=#C2FFFF
| 601037 ||  || — || December 2, 2005 || Mauna Kea || Mauna Kea Obs. || L5 || align=right | 7.5 km || 
|-id=038 bgcolor=#E9E9E9
| 601038 ||  || — || November 7, 2005 || Mauna Kea || Mauna Kea Obs. ||  || align=right | 1.5 km || 
|-id=039 bgcolor=#E9E9E9
| 601039 ||  || — || October 29, 2008 || Kitt Peak || Spacewatch ||  || align=right | 1.1 km || 
|-id=040 bgcolor=#E9E9E9
| 601040 ||  || — || October 18, 2003 || Kitt Peak || Spacewatch ||  || align=right | 1.8 km || 
|-id=041 bgcolor=#E9E9E9
| 601041 ||  || — || December 31, 2008 || Kitt Peak || Spacewatch ||  || align=right | 1.6 km || 
|-id=042 bgcolor=#d6d6d6
| 601042 ||  || — || October 1, 2006 || Kitt Peak || Spacewatch ||  || align=right | 2.6 km || 
|-id=043 bgcolor=#d6d6d6
| 601043 ||  || — || October 20, 2012 || Kitt Peak || Spacewatch ||  || align=right | 2.4 km || 
|-id=044 bgcolor=#E9E9E9
| 601044 ||  || — || October 15, 2012 || Mount Lemmon || Mount Lemmon Survey ||  || align=right | 1.4 km || 
|-id=045 bgcolor=#E9E9E9
| 601045 ||  || — || September 16, 2003 || Palomar || NEAT ||  || align=right | 1.5 km || 
|-id=046 bgcolor=#E9E9E9
| 601046 ||  || — || October 20, 2003 || Kitt Peak || Spacewatch || WIT || align=right | 1.3 km || 
|-id=047 bgcolor=#d6d6d6
| 601047 ||  || — || October 16, 2012 || Mount Lemmon || Mount Lemmon Survey ||  || align=right | 2.6 km || 
|-id=048 bgcolor=#d6d6d6
| 601048 ||  || — || September 17, 2012 || Kitt Peak || Spacewatch ||  || align=right | 3.0 km || 
|-id=049 bgcolor=#E9E9E9
| 601049 ||  || — || December 6, 2008 || Kitt Peak || Spacewatch ||  || align=right | 1.3 km || 
|-id=050 bgcolor=#E9E9E9
| 601050 ||  || — || October 18, 2012 || Haleakala || Pan-STARRS ||  || align=right | 1.9 km || 
|-id=051 bgcolor=#E9E9E9
| 601051 ||  || — || August 25, 2003 || Palomar || NEAT ||  || align=right | 1.9 km || 
|-id=052 bgcolor=#E9E9E9
| 601052 ||  || — || June 4, 2011 || Mount Lemmon || Mount Lemmon Survey ||  || align=right | 1.6 km || 
|-id=053 bgcolor=#d6d6d6
| 601053 ||  || — || February 17, 2004 || Kitt Peak || Spacewatch ||  || align=right | 3.4 km || 
|-id=054 bgcolor=#fefefe
| 601054 ||  || — || August 28, 2012 || Mount Lemmon || Mount Lemmon Survey || NYS || align=right data-sort-value="0.51" | 510 m || 
|-id=055 bgcolor=#E9E9E9
| 601055 ||  || — || October 8, 2012 || Mount Lemmon || Mount Lemmon Survey ||  || align=right | 1.5 km || 
|-id=056 bgcolor=#E9E9E9
| 601056 ||  || — || November 1, 2008 || Mount Lemmon || Mount Lemmon Survey ||  || align=right data-sort-value="0.75" | 750 m || 
|-id=057 bgcolor=#d6d6d6
| 601057 ||  || — || November 2, 2007 || Kitt Peak || Spacewatch ||  || align=right | 2.4 km || 
|-id=058 bgcolor=#d6d6d6
| 601058 ||  || — || October 24, 2001 || Socorro || LINEAR ||  || align=right | 2.7 km || 
|-id=059 bgcolor=#E9E9E9
| 601059 ||  || — || October 22, 2012 || Haleakala || Pan-STARRS ||  || align=right | 1.5 km || 
|-id=060 bgcolor=#E9E9E9
| 601060 ||  || — || August 25, 2003 || Haleakala || AMOS || EUN || align=right | 1.6 km || 
|-id=061 bgcolor=#E9E9E9
| 601061 ||  || — || October 23, 2003 || Anderson Mesa || LONEOS ||  || align=right | 1.6 km || 
|-id=062 bgcolor=#d6d6d6
| 601062 ||  || — || February 28, 2009 || Mount Lemmon || Mount Lemmon Survey ||  || align=right | 2.9 km || 
|-id=063 bgcolor=#E9E9E9
| 601063 ||  || — || October 16, 2012 || Kitt Peak || Spacewatch ||  || align=right | 1.8 km || 
|-id=064 bgcolor=#E9E9E9
| 601064 ||  || — || November 22, 2000 || Haleakala || AMOS || MAR || align=right | 1.2 km || 
|-id=065 bgcolor=#E9E9E9
| 601065 ||  || — || September 29, 2003 || Kitt Peak || Spacewatch ||  || align=right | 1.6 km || 
|-id=066 bgcolor=#E9E9E9
| 601066 ||  || — || October 8, 2012 || Haleakala || Pan-STARRS ||  || align=right | 1.3 km || 
|-id=067 bgcolor=#E9E9E9
| 601067 ||  || — || October 18, 2012 || Mount Lemmon || Mount Lemmon Survey ||  || align=right | 1.6 km || 
|-id=068 bgcolor=#E9E9E9
| 601068 ||  || — || October 18, 2012 || Haleakala || Pan-STARRS ||  || align=right | 1.2 km || 
|-id=069 bgcolor=#d6d6d6
| 601069 ||  || — || October 8, 2012 || Haleakala || Pan-STARRS || 3:2 || align=right | 3.3 km || 
|-id=070 bgcolor=#E9E9E9
| 601070 ||  || — || August 25, 2003 || Palomar || NEAT ||  || align=right | 1.6 km || 
|-id=071 bgcolor=#E9E9E9
| 601071 ||  || — || May 7, 2006 || Mount Lemmon || Mount Lemmon Survey ||  || align=right | 1.8 km || 
|-id=072 bgcolor=#d6d6d6
| 601072 ||  || — || October 22, 2012 || Kitt Peak || Spacewatch ||  || align=right | 2.4 km || 
|-id=073 bgcolor=#E9E9E9
| 601073 ||  || — || October 23, 2012 || Mount Lemmon || Mount Lemmon Survey ||  || align=right | 2.4 km || 
|-id=074 bgcolor=#E9E9E9
| 601074 ||  || — || October 10, 2012 || Haleakala || Pan-STARRS ||  || align=right | 1.5 km || 
|-id=075 bgcolor=#E9E9E9
| 601075 ||  || — || May 23, 2011 || Nogales || M. Schwartz, P. R. Holvorcem || MAR || align=right | 1.2 km || 
|-id=076 bgcolor=#d6d6d6
| 601076 ||  || — || October 17, 2012 || Haleakala || Pan-STARRS ||  || align=right | 3.0 km || 
|-id=077 bgcolor=#E9E9E9
| 601077 ||  || — || October 22, 2008 || Kitt Peak || Spacewatch ||  || align=right | 1.7 km || 
|-id=078 bgcolor=#d6d6d6
| 601078 ||  || — || October 22, 2012 || Haleakala || Pan-STARRS ||  || align=right | 4.1 km || 
|-id=079 bgcolor=#E9E9E9
| 601079 ||  || — || October 6, 2012 || Haleakala || Pan-STARRS ||  || align=right | 1.6 km || 
|-id=080 bgcolor=#E9E9E9
| 601080 ||  || — || October 31, 2012 || Haleakala || Pan-STARRS ||  || align=right | 1.6 km || 
|-id=081 bgcolor=#d6d6d6
| 601081 ||  || — || October 21, 2012 || Catalina || CSS || Tj (2.99) || align=right | 2.8 km || 
|-id=082 bgcolor=#E9E9E9
| 601082 ||  || — || December 3, 2008 || Catalina || CSS ||  || align=right | 1.7 km || 
|-id=083 bgcolor=#d6d6d6
| 601083 ||  || — || October 22, 2012 || Mount Lemmon || Mount Lemmon Survey ||  || align=right | 2.5 km || 
|-id=084 bgcolor=#E9E9E9
| 601084 ||  || — || July 22, 2002 || Palomar || NEAT ||  || align=right | 2.7 km || 
|-id=085 bgcolor=#E9E9E9
| 601085 ||  || — || December 18, 2004 || Mount Lemmon || Mount Lemmon Survey ||  || align=right | 1.1 km || 
|-id=086 bgcolor=#E9E9E9
| 601086 ||  || — || October 17, 2012 || Haleakala || Pan-STARRS ||  || align=right | 1.8 km || 
|-id=087 bgcolor=#E9E9E9
| 601087 ||  || — || October 22, 2012 || Haleakala || Pan-STARRS ||  || align=right | 1.1 km || 
|-id=088 bgcolor=#d6d6d6
| 601088 ||  || — || October 18, 2012 || Mount Lemmon || Mount Lemmon Survey ||  || align=right | 2.7 km || 
|-id=089 bgcolor=#d6d6d6
| 601089 ||  || — || October 27, 2012 || Mount Lemmon || Mount Lemmon Survey ||  || align=right | 2.1 km || 
|-id=090 bgcolor=#E9E9E9
| 601090 ||  || — || October 20, 2012 || Haleakala || Pan-STARRS ||  || align=right | 1.6 km || 
|-id=091 bgcolor=#d6d6d6
| 601091 ||  || — || October 19, 2012 || Haleakala || Pan-STARRS ||  || align=right | 2.3 km || 
|-id=092 bgcolor=#E9E9E9
| 601092 ||  || — || February 20, 2014 || Mount Lemmon || Mount Lemmon Survey ||  || align=right data-sort-value="0.83" | 830 m || 
|-id=093 bgcolor=#E9E9E9
| 601093 ||  || — || October 17, 2012 || Haleakala || Pan-STARRS ||  || align=right | 1.7 km || 
|-id=094 bgcolor=#d6d6d6
| 601094 ||  || — || July 30, 2017 || Haleakala || Pan-STARRS ||  || align=right | 2.2 km || 
|-id=095 bgcolor=#E9E9E9
| 601095 ||  || — || October 18, 2012 || Haleakala || Pan-STARRS ||  || align=right | 1.1 km || 
|-id=096 bgcolor=#E9E9E9
| 601096 ||  || — || October 21, 2012 || Kitt Peak || Spacewatch ||  || align=right | 1.8 km || 
|-id=097 bgcolor=#E9E9E9
| 601097 ||  || — || October 21, 2012 || Haleakala || Pan-STARRS ||  || align=right | 1.1 km || 
|-id=098 bgcolor=#d6d6d6
| 601098 ||  || — || October 18, 2012 || Haleakala || Pan-STARRS ||  || align=right | 2.5 km || 
|-id=099 bgcolor=#E9E9E9
| 601099 ||  || — || October 20, 2012 || Kitt Peak || Spacewatch ||  || align=right | 1.3 km || 
|-id=100 bgcolor=#E9E9E9
| 601100 ||  || — || October 16, 2012 || Mount Lemmon || Mount Lemmon Survey ||  || align=right data-sort-value="0.94" | 940 m || 
|}

601101–601200 

|-bgcolor=#E9E9E9
| 601101 ||  || — || October 21, 2012 || Haleakala || Pan-STARRS ||  || align=right | 1.6 km || 
|-id=102 bgcolor=#E9E9E9
| 601102 ||  || — || April 24, 2015 || Haleakala || Pan-STARRS ||  || align=right data-sort-value="0.61" | 610 m || 
|-id=103 bgcolor=#E9E9E9
| 601103 ||  || — || October 20, 2012 || Kitt Peak || Spacewatch ||  || align=right | 1.0 km || 
|-id=104 bgcolor=#E9E9E9
| 601104 ||  || — || October 21, 2012 || Haleakala || Pan-STARRS ||  || align=right | 1.6 km || 
|-id=105 bgcolor=#E9E9E9
| 601105 ||  || — || October 18, 2012 || Haleakala || Pan-STARRS ||  || align=right | 1.2 km || 
|-id=106 bgcolor=#E9E9E9
| 601106 ||  || — || October 17, 2012 || Mount Lemmon || Mount Lemmon Survey ||  || align=right data-sort-value="0.77" | 770 m || 
|-id=107 bgcolor=#E9E9E9
| 601107 ||  || — || November 8, 2008 || Mount Lemmon || Mount Lemmon Survey ||  || align=right data-sort-value="0.75" | 750 m || 
|-id=108 bgcolor=#d6d6d6
| 601108 ||  || — || October 18, 2012 || Haleakala || Pan-STARRS ||  || align=right | 2.2 km || 
|-id=109 bgcolor=#d6d6d6
| 601109 ||  || — || October 22, 2012 || Haleakala || Pan-STARRS ||  || align=right | 1.5 km || 
|-id=110 bgcolor=#d6d6d6
| 601110 ||  || — || October 18, 2012 || Haleakala || Pan-STARRS ||  || align=right | 1.4 km || 
|-id=111 bgcolor=#E9E9E9
| 601111 ||  || — || October 6, 2012 || Haleakala || Pan-STARRS ||  || align=right | 1.8 km || 
|-id=112 bgcolor=#fefefe
| 601112 ||  || — || October 31, 2005 || Mount Lemmon || Mount Lemmon Survey ||  || align=right data-sort-value="0.50" | 500 m || 
|-id=113 bgcolor=#d6d6d6
| 601113 ||  || — || November 6, 2012 || Mount Lemmon || Mount Lemmon Survey ||  || align=right | 2.2 km || 
|-id=114 bgcolor=#E9E9E9
| 601114 ||  || — || January 2, 2009 || Mount Lemmon || Mount Lemmon Survey ||  || align=right | 1.8 km || 
|-id=115 bgcolor=#E9E9E9
| 601115 ||  || — || November 19, 2003 || Kitt Peak || Spacewatch ||  || align=right | 1.2 km || 
|-id=116 bgcolor=#fefefe
| 601116 ||  || — || July 22, 2001 || Palomar || NEAT ||  || align=right data-sort-value="0.87" | 870 m || 
|-id=117 bgcolor=#E9E9E9
| 601117 ||  || — || July 19, 2002 || Palomar || NEAT ||  || align=right | 2.0 km || 
|-id=118 bgcolor=#E9E9E9
| 601118 ||  || — || October 29, 2003 || Kitt Peak || Spacewatch ||  || align=right | 1.3 km || 
|-id=119 bgcolor=#E9E9E9
| 601119 ||  || — || October 27, 2008 || Kitt Peak || Spacewatch ||  || align=right data-sort-value="0.86" | 860 m || 
|-id=120 bgcolor=#E9E9E9
| 601120 ||  || — || May 2, 2006 || Mount Lemmon || Mount Lemmon Survey || WIT || align=right data-sort-value="0.77" | 770 m || 
|-id=121 bgcolor=#E9E9E9
| 601121 ||  || — || August 25, 2003 || Cerro Tololo || Cerro Tololo Obs. ||  || align=right | 1.2 km || 
|-id=122 bgcolor=#E9E9E9
| 601122 ||  || — || March 9, 2005 || Kitt Peak || M. W. Buie, L. H. Wasserman ||  || align=right | 1.9 km || 
|-id=123 bgcolor=#d6d6d6
| 601123 ||  || — || November 6, 2012 || Mount Lemmon || Mount Lemmon Survey ||  || align=right | 2.0 km || 
|-id=124 bgcolor=#E9E9E9
| 601124 ||  || — || May 24, 2006 || Mount Lemmon || Mount Lemmon Survey || HNS || align=right | 1.1 km || 
|-id=125 bgcolor=#E9E9E9
| 601125 ||  || — || April 24, 2006 || Kitt Peak || Spacewatch ||  || align=right | 1.4 km || 
|-id=126 bgcolor=#E9E9E9
| 601126 ||  || — || October 22, 2012 || Haleakala || Pan-STARRS ||  || align=right | 1.7 km || 
|-id=127 bgcolor=#E9E9E9
| 601127 ||  || — || October 16, 2012 || Kitt Peak || Spacewatch ||  || align=right | 1.8 km || 
|-id=128 bgcolor=#d6d6d6
| 601128 ||  || — || October 17, 2012 || Mount Lemmon || Mount Lemmon Survey ||  || align=right | 1.7 km || 
|-id=129 bgcolor=#d6d6d6
| 601129 ||  || — || March 30, 2004 || Kitt Peak || Spacewatch || EOS || align=right | 2.5 km || 
|-id=130 bgcolor=#fefefe
| 601130 ||  || — || November 12, 2012 || Haleakala || Pan-STARRS || H || align=right data-sort-value="0.55" | 550 m || 
|-id=131 bgcolor=#E9E9E9
| 601131 ||  || — || November 12, 2012 || Haleakala || Pan-STARRS ||  || align=right | 1.2 km || 
|-id=132 bgcolor=#E9E9E9
| 601132 ||  || — || November 21, 2003 || Palomar || NEAT ||  || align=right | 1.7 km || 
|-id=133 bgcolor=#E9E9E9
| 601133 ||  || — || September 14, 2007 || Mount Lemmon || Mount Lemmon Survey ||  || align=right | 1.9 km || 
|-id=134 bgcolor=#E9E9E9
| 601134 ||  || — || November 14, 2012 || Kitt Peak || Spacewatch ||  || align=right | 1.5 km || 
|-id=135 bgcolor=#d6d6d6
| 601135 ||  || — || August 25, 2001 || Palomar || NEAT || EOS || align=right | 2.7 km || 
|-id=136 bgcolor=#d6d6d6
| 601136 ||  || — || October 22, 2012 || Mount Lemmon || Mount Lemmon Survey ||  || align=right | 2.4 km || 
|-id=137 bgcolor=#E9E9E9
| 601137 ||  || — || October 29, 2003 || Kitt Peak || Spacewatch ||  || align=right | 2.1 km || 
|-id=138 bgcolor=#E9E9E9
| 601138 ||  || — || October 2, 2003 || Kitt Peak || Spacewatch ||  || align=right | 1.4 km || 
|-id=139 bgcolor=#d6d6d6
| 601139 ||  || — || November 12, 2012 || Mount Lemmon || Mount Lemmon Survey ||  || align=right | 2.1 km || 
|-id=140 bgcolor=#d6d6d6
| 601140 ||  || — || October 16, 2012 || Kitt Peak || Spacewatch ||  || align=right | 2.7 km || 
|-id=141 bgcolor=#E9E9E9
| 601141 ||  || — || December 1, 2008 || Catalina || CSS ||  || align=right data-sort-value="0.79" | 790 m || 
|-id=142 bgcolor=#E9E9E9
| 601142 ||  || — || October 21, 2012 || Haleakala || Pan-STARRS ||  || align=right | 1.8 km || 
|-id=143 bgcolor=#E9E9E9
| 601143 ||  || — || February 7, 2008 || Catalina || CSS ||  || align=right | 4.2 km || 
|-id=144 bgcolor=#d6d6d6
| 601144 ||  || — || October 19, 2012 || Haleakala || Pan-STARRS ||  || align=right | 3.0 km || 
|-id=145 bgcolor=#E9E9E9
| 601145 ||  || — || November 15, 2012 || Nogales || M. Schwartz, P. R. Holvorcem ||  || align=right | 1.4 km || 
|-id=146 bgcolor=#E9E9E9
| 601146 ||  || — || August 6, 2016 || Haleakala || Pan-STARRS ||  || align=right | 1.5 km || 
|-id=147 bgcolor=#E9E9E9
| 601147 ||  || — || November 7, 2012 || Haleakala || Pan-STARRS ||  || align=right | 1.7 km || 
|-id=148 bgcolor=#E9E9E9
| 601148 ||  || — || November 12, 2012 || Haleakala || Pan-STARRS ||  || align=right | 1.6 km || 
|-id=149 bgcolor=#E9E9E9
| 601149 ||  || — || June 23, 2015 || Haleakala || Pan-STARRS ||  || align=right | 1.4 km || 
|-id=150 bgcolor=#d6d6d6
| 601150 ||  || — || November 14, 2012 || Kitt Peak || Spacewatch || 3:2 || align=right | 4.1 km || 
|-id=151 bgcolor=#E9E9E9
| 601151 ||  || — || November 15, 2012 || Catalina || CSS ||  || align=right | 1.4 km || 
|-id=152 bgcolor=#d6d6d6
| 601152 ||  || — || November 7, 2012 || Kitt Peak || Spacewatch || 3:2 || align=right | 3.9 km || 
|-id=153 bgcolor=#E9E9E9
| 601153 ||  || — || November 4, 2012 || Mount Lemmon || Mount Lemmon Survey ||  || align=right | 1.7 km || 
|-id=154 bgcolor=#E9E9E9
| 601154 ||  || — || November 6, 2012 || Kitt Peak || Spacewatch ||  || align=right | 2.2 km || 
|-id=155 bgcolor=#fefefe
| 601155 ||  || — || December 16, 2004 || Socorro || LINEAR || H || align=right data-sort-value="0.74" | 740 m || 
|-id=156 bgcolor=#d6d6d6
| 601156 ||  || — || October 26, 2012 || Kitt Peak || Spacewatch ||  || align=right | 2.2 km || 
|-id=157 bgcolor=#d6d6d6
| 601157 ||  || — || October 6, 2012 || Kitt Peak || Spacewatch ||  || align=right | 3.8 km || 
|-id=158 bgcolor=#E9E9E9
| 601158 ||  || — || June 13, 2015 || Haleakala || Pan-STARRS ||  || align=right | 1.3 km || 
|-id=159 bgcolor=#E9E9E9
| 601159 ||  || — || November 25, 2012 || Kitt Peak || Spacewatch ||  || align=right | 1.8 km || 
|-id=160 bgcolor=#E9E9E9
| 601160 ||  || — || November 20, 2012 || Mount Lemmon || Mount Lemmon Survey ||  || align=right data-sort-value="0.69" | 690 m || 
|-id=161 bgcolor=#d6d6d6
| 601161 ||  || — || November 23, 2012 || Kitt Peak || Spacewatch || 7:4 || align=right | 2.5 km || 
|-id=162 bgcolor=#d6d6d6
| 601162 ||  || — || November 20, 2012 || Mount Lemmon || Mount Lemmon Survey ||  || align=right | 2.1 km || 
|-id=163 bgcolor=#d6d6d6
| 601163 ||  || — || October 22, 2006 || Palomar || NEAT ||  || align=right | 3.2 km || 
|-id=164 bgcolor=#E9E9E9
| 601164 ||  || — || September 19, 2003 || Palomar || NEAT || HNS || align=right | 1.8 km || 
|-id=165 bgcolor=#E9E9E9
| 601165 ||  || — || October 19, 2007 || Mount Lemmon || Mount Lemmon Survey ||  || align=right | 1.9 km || 
|-id=166 bgcolor=#d6d6d6
| 601166 ||  || — || November 7, 2012 || Kitt Peak || Spacewatch ||  || align=right | 3.5 km || 
|-id=167 bgcolor=#d6d6d6
| 601167 ||  || — || September 15, 2006 || Kitt Peak || Spacewatch ||  || align=right | 2.0 km || 
|-id=168 bgcolor=#E9E9E9
| 601168 ||  || — || December 13, 1999 || Kitt Peak || Spacewatch ||  || align=right | 1.2 km || 
|-id=169 bgcolor=#d6d6d6
| 601169 ||  || — || October 22, 2012 || Mount Lemmon || Mount Lemmon Survey ||  || align=right | 2.3 km || 
|-id=170 bgcolor=#E9E9E9
| 601170 ||  || — || October 22, 2012 || Mount Lemmon || Mount Lemmon Survey ||  || align=right | 1.2 km || 
|-id=171 bgcolor=#E9E9E9
| 601171 ||  || — || December 3, 2012 || Mount Lemmon || Mount Lemmon Survey ||  || align=right data-sort-value="0.69" | 690 m || 
|-id=172 bgcolor=#E9E9E9
| 601172 ||  || — || October 14, 2007 || Kitt Peak || Spacewatch ||  || align=right | 1.6 km || 
|-id=173 bgcolor=#E9E9E9
| 601173 ||  || — || October 10, 2007 || Mount Lemmon || Mount Lemmon Survey ||  || align=right | 2.1 km || 
|-id=174 bgcolor=#E9E9E9
| 601174 ||  || — || November 7, 2012 || Mount Lemmon || Mount Lemmon Survey ||  || align=right | 1.2 km || 
|-id=175 bgcolor=#E9E9E9
| 601175 ||  || — || November 19, 2012 || Kitt Peak || Spacewatch ||  || align=right | 1.8 km || 
|-id=176 bgcolor=#E9E9E9
| 601176 ||  || — || August 27, 2003 || Palomar || NEAT ||  || align=right | 1.4 km || 
|-id=177 bgcolor=#E9E9E9
| 601177 ||  || — || October 22, 2003 || Apache Point || SDSS Collaboration ||  || align=right | 1.7 km || 
|-id=178 bgcolor=#d6d6d6
| 601178 ||  || — || September 30, 2006 || Mount Lemmon || Mount Lemmon Survey ||  || align=right | 2.6 km || 
|-id=179 bgcolor=#E9E9E9
| 601179 ||  || — || March 17, 2005 || Mount Lemmon || Mount Lemmon Survey ||  || align=right | 1.5 km || 
|-id=180 bgcolor=#E9E9E9
| 601180 ||  || — || March 17, 2005 || Kitt Peak || Spacewatch ||  || align=right | 1.9 km || 
|-id=181 bgcolor=#d6d6d6
| 601181 ||  || — || November 11, 2001 || Apache Point || SDSS Collaboration ||  || align=right | 2.8 km || 
|-id=182 bgcolor=#E9E9E9
| 601182 ||  || — || February 1, 2009 || Kitt Peak || Spacewatch ||  || align=right | 1.3 km || 
|-id=183 bgcolor=#d6d6d6
| 601183 ||  || — || November 7, 2012 || Haleakala || Pan-STARRS ||  || align=right | 3.0 km || 
|-id=184 bgcolor=#E9E9E9
| 601184 ||  || — || November 23, 2012 || Kitt Peak || Spacewatch ||  || align=right | 1.6 km || 
|-id=185 bgcolor=#E9E9E9
| 601185 ||  || — || April 8, 2006 || Kitt Peak || Spacewatch ||  || align=right | 1.9 km || 
|-id=186 bgcolor=#E9E9E9
| 601186 ||  || — || December 6, 2012 || Mount Lemmon || Mount Lemmon Survey ||  || align=right data-sort-value="0.86" | 860 m || 
|-id=187 bgcolor=#E9E9E9
| 601187 ||  || — || December 6, 2012 || Mount Lemmon || Mount Lemmon Survey ||  || align=right | 1.5 km || 
|-id=188 bgcolor=#d6d6d6
| 601188 ||  || — || December 7, 2012 || Haleakala || Pan-STARRS ||  || align=right | 2.6 km || 
|-id=189 bgcolor=#d6d6d6
| 601189 ||  || — || January 1, 2008 || Kitt Peak || Spacewatch || THM || align=right | 1.5 km || 
|-id=190 bgcolor=#d6d6d6
| 601190 ||  || — || December 13, 2001 || Palomar || NEAT ||  || align=right | 4.3 km || 
|-id=191 bgcolor=#E9E9E9
| 601191 ||  || — || July 27, 2011 || Haleakala || Pan-STARRS ||  || align=right | 1.8 km || 
|-id=192 bgcolor=#d6d6d6
| 601192 ||  || — || June 21, 2012 || Kitt Peak || Spacewatch ||  || align=right | 3.0 km || 
|-id=193 bgcolor=#E9E9E9
| 601193 ||  || — || November 21, 2003 || Palomar || NEAT ||  || align=right | 2.4 km || 
|-id=194 bgcolor=#E9E9E9
| 601194 ||  || — || November 5, 2012 || Kitt Peak || Spacewatch ||  || align=right | 1.4 km || 
|-id=195 bgcolor=#E9E9E9
| 601195 ||  || — || December 9, 2012 || Haleakala || Pan-STARRS ||  || align=right | 1.2 km || 
|-id=196 bgcolor=#E9E9E9
| 601196 ||  || — || December 10, 2012 || Haleakala || Pan-STARRS ||  || align=right | 2.5 km || 
|-id=197 bgcolor=#d6d6d6
| 601197 ||  || — || July 27, 2011 || Haleakala || Pan-STARRS ||  || align=right | 2.2 km || 
|-id=198 bgcolor=#E9E9E9
| 601198 ||  || — || October 20, 2012 || Haleakala || Pan-STARRS ||  || align=right | 2.0 km || 
|-id=199 bgcolor=#E9E9E9
| 601199 ||  || — || January 20, 2009 || Mount Lemmon || Mount Lemmon Survey ||  || align=right | 1.8 km || 
|-id=200 bgcolor=#E9E9E9
| 601200 ||  || — || January 31, 2009 || Mount Lemmon || Mount Lemmon Survey ||  || align=right | 2.2 km || 
|}

601201–601300 

|-bgcolor=#E9E9E9
| 601201 ||  || — || January 20, 2009 || Catalina || CSS ||  || align=right | 1.7 km || 
|-id=202 bgcolor=#d6d6d6
| 601202 ||  || — || December 13, 2012 || Oukaimeden || C. Rinner ||  || align=right | 3.2 km || 
|-id=203 bgcolor=#E9E9E9
| 601203 ||  || — || October 21, 2003 || Anderson Mesa || LONEOS ||  || align=right | 1.7 km || 
|-id=204 bgcolor=#d6d6d6
| 601204 ||  || — || August 26, 2000 || Cerro Tololo || R. Millis, L. H. Wasserman ||  || align=right | 1.9 km || 
|-id=205 bgcolor=#E9E9E9
| 601205 ||  || — || September 11, 2007 || Mount Lemmon || Mount Lemmon Survey ||  || align=right | 1.4 km || 
|-id=206 bgcolor=#E9E9E9
| 601206 ||  || — || October 1, 2003 || Kitt Peak || Spacewatch ||  || align=right | 1.2 km || 
|-id=207 bgcolor=#d6d6d6
| 601207 ||  || — || December 7, 2007 || Bisei SG Center || A. Asami, S. Urakawa || BRA || align=right | 1.7 km || 
|-id=208 bgcolor=#d6d6d6
| 601208 ||  || — || October 15, 2001 || Palomar || NEAT ||  || align=right | 2.9 km || 
|-id=209 bgcolor=#E9E9E9
| 601209 ||  || — || December 9, 2012 || Haleakala || Pan-STARRS ||  || align=right | 2.0 km || 
|-id=210 bgcolor=#E9E9E9
| 601210 ||  || — || May 21, 2015 || Haleakala || Pan-STARRS ||  || align=right | 1.5 km || 
|-id=211 bgcolor=#E9E9E9
| 601211 ||  || — || December 3, 2012 || Mount Lemmon || Mount Lemmon Survey ||  || align=right | 1.6 km || 
|-id=212 bgcolor=#E9E9E9
| 601212 ||  || — || December 12, 2012 || Mount Lemmon || Mount Lemmon Survey ||  || align=right | 1.8 km || 
|-id=213 bgcolor=#E9E9E9
| 601213 ||  || — || December 4, 2012 || Mount Lemmon || Mount Lemmon Survey ||  || align=right | 1.2 km || 
|-id=214 bgcolor=#E9E9E9
| 601214 ||  || — || October 1, 2016 || Kitt Peak || Spacewatch ||  || align=right | 1.7 km || 
|-id=215 bgcolor=#E9E9E9
| 601215 ||  || — || February 28, 2014 || Haleakala || Pan-STARRS ||  || align=right data-sort-value="0.77" | 770 m || 
|-id=216 bgcolor=#E9E9E9
| 601216 ||  || — || December 8, 2012 || Mount Lemmon || Mount Lemmon Survey ||  || align=right data-sort-value="0.96" | 960 m || 
|-id=217 bgcolor=#E9E9E9
| 601217 ||  || — || December 12, 2012 || Mount Lemmon || Mount Lemmon Survey ||  || align=right | 1.8 km || 
|-id=218 bgcolor=#d6d6d6
| 601218 ||  || — || December 3, 2012 || Mount Lemmon || Mount Lemmon Survey ||  || align=right | 2.6 km || 
|-id=219 bgcolor=#d6d6d6
| 601219 ||  || — || December 12, 2012 || Mount Lemmon || Mount Lemmon Survey ||  || align=right | 3.1 km || 
|-id=220 bgcolor=#E9E9E9
| 601220 ||  || — || December 6, 2012 || Kitt Peak || Spacewatch ||  || align=right | 1.2 km || 
|-id=221 bgcolor=#E9E9E9
| 601221 ||  || — || December 9, 2012 || Haleakala || Pan-STARRS ||  || align=right | 1.2 km || 
|-id=222 bgcolor=#E9E9E9
| 601222 ||  || — || October 22, 2012 || Haleakala || Pan-STARRS ||  || align=right | 1.1 km || 
|-id=223 bgcolor=#d6d6d6
| 601223 ||  || — || December 8, 2012 || Mount Lemmon || Mount Lemmon Survey ||  || align=right | 1.9 km || 
|-id=224 bgcolor=#d6d6d6
| 601224 ||  || — || December 2, 2012 || Mount Lemmon || Mount Lemmon Survey ||  || align=right | 2.2 km || 
|-id=225 bgcolor=#d6d6d6
| 601225 ||  || — || September 1, 2005 || Palomar || NEAT ||  || align=right | 3.3 km || 
|-id=226 bgcolor=#E9E9E9
| 601226 ||  || — || November 4, 2012 || Kitt Peak || Spacewatch ||  || align=right | 1.4 km || 
|-id=227 bgcolor=#C2FFFF
| 601227 ||  || — || December 18, 2012 || Oukaimeden || M. Ory || L4 || align=right | 7.2 km || 
|-id=228 bgcolor=#fefefe
| 601228 ||  || — || June 6, 2011 || Mount Lemmon || Mount Lemmon Survey || H || align=right data-sort-value="0.64" | 640 m || 
|-id=229 bgcolor=#FA8072
| 601229 ||  || — || December 30, 2005 || Catalina || CSS ||  || align=right data-sort-value="0.88" | 880 m || 
|-id=230 bgcolor=#fefefe
| 601230 ||  || — || December 23, 2012 || Haleakala || Pan-STARRS ||  || align=right data-sort-value="0.51" | 510 m || 
|-id=231 bgcolor=#d6d6d6
| 601231 ||  || — || December 23, 2012 || Haleakala || Pan-STARRS ||  || align=right | 2.1 km || 
|-id=232 bgcolor=#fefefe
| 601232 ||  || — || October 16, 2012 || Mount Lemmon || Mount Lemmon Survey ||  || align=right data-sort-value="0.66" | 660 m || 
|-id=233 bgcolor=#fefefe
| 601233 ||  || — || December 23, 2012 || Haleakala || Pan-STARRS ||  || align=right data-sort-value="0.56" | 560 m || 
|-id=234 bgcolor=#fefefe
| 601234 ||  || — || September 14, 2005 || Kitt Peak || Spacewatch ||  || align=right data-sort-value="0.45" | 450 m || 
|-id=235 bgcolor=#d6d6d6
| 601235 ||  || — || December 23, 2012 || Haleakala || Pan-STARRS ||  || align=right | 2.4 km || 
|-id=236 bgcolor=#E9E9E9
| 601236 ||  || — || May 19, 2010 || Mount Lemmon || Mount Lemmon Survey ||  || align=right | 2.6 km || 
|-id=237 bgcolor=#d6d6d6
| 601237 ||  || — || January 3, 2013 || Oukaimeden || C. Rinner || Tj (2.99) || align=right | 2.6 km || 
|-id=238 bgcolor=#E9E9E9
| 601238 ||  || — || January 4, 2013 || Mount Lemmon || Mount Lemmon Survey ||  || align=right | 2.0 km || 
|-id=239 bgcolor=#E9E9E9
| 601239 ||  || — || October 8, 2007 || Mount Lemmon || Mount Lemmon Survey ||  || align=right | 1.6 km || 
|-id=240 bgcolor=#E9E9E9
| 601240 ||  || — || December 17, 2012 || ESA OGS || ESA OGS ||  || align=right | 1.6 km || 
|-id=241 bgcolor=#E9E9E9
| 601241 ||  || — || August 31, 2011 || Piszkesteto || K. Sárneczky ||  || align=right | 2.4 km || 
|-id=242 bgcolor=#d6d6d6
| 601242 ||  || — || November 3, 2011 || Mount Lemmon || Mount Lemmon Survey ||  || align=right | 2.1 km || 
|-id=243 bgcolor=#d6d6d6
| 601243 ||  || — || July 4, 2005 || Mount Lemmon || Mount Lemmon Survey || LIX || align=right | 3.2 km || 
|-id=244 bgcolor=#C2FFFF
| 601244 ||  || — || January 5, 2013 || Mount Lemmon || Mount Lemmon Survey || L4 || align=right | 9.2 km || 
|-id=245 bgcolor=#E9E9E9
| 601245 ||  || — || December 1, 2008 || Kitt Peak || Spacewatch ||  || align=right | 1.6 km || 
|-id=246 bgcolor=#C2FFFF
| 601246 ||  || — || December 22, 2012 || Haleakala || Pan-STARRS || L4 || align=right | 7.3 km || 
|-id=247 bgcolor=#d6d6d6
| 601247 ||  || — || March 18, 2009 || Mount Lemmon || Mount Lemmon Survey ||  || align=right | 2.6 km || 
|-id=248 bgcolor=#E9E9E9
| 601248 ||  || — || January 3, 2013 || Mount Lemmon || Mount Lemmon Survey ||  || align=right | 1.3 km || 
|-id=249 bgcolor=#E9E9E9
| 601249 ||  || — || January 20, 2009 || Mount Lemmon || Mount Lemmon Survey ||  || align=right data-sort-value="0.65" | 650 m || 
|-id=250 bgcolor=#d6d6d6
| 601250 ||  || — || January 6, 2013 || Kitt Peak || Spacewatch ||  || align=right | 1.8 km || 
|-id=251 bgcolor=#fefefe
| 601251 ||  || — || January 5, 2013 || Mount Lemmon || Mount Lemmon Survey ||  || align=right data-sort-value="0.64" | 640 m || 
|-id=252 bgcolor=#E9E9E9
| 601252 ||  || — || October 10, 2007 || Mount Lemmon || Mount Lemmon Survey ||  || align=right | 1.7 km || 
|-id=253 bgcolor=#C2FFFF
| 601253 ||  || — || August 31, 2007 || Siding Spring || K. Sárneczky, L. Kiss || L4 || align=right | 11 km || 
|-id=254 bgcolor=#C2FFFF
| 601254 ||  || — || May 1, 2004 || Kitt Peak || Spacewatch || L4 || align=right | 7.7 km || 
|-id=255 bgcolor=#C2FFFF
| 601255 ||  || — || January 10, 2013 || Haleakala || Pan-STARRS || L4 || align=right | 11 km || 
|-id=256 bgcolor=#d6d6d6
| 601256 ||  || — || January 7, 2013 || La Sagra || OAM Obs. ||  || align=right | 3.4 km || 
|-id=257 bgcolor=#d6d6d6
| 601257 ||  || — || January 5, 2001 || Haleakala || AMOS || 7:4* || align=right | 2.6 km || 
|-id=258 bgcolor=#E9E9E9
| 601258 ||  || — || October 10, 2007 || Kitt Peak || Spacewatch ||  || align=right | 1.4 km || 
|-id=259 bgcolor=#E9E9E9
| 601259 ||  || — || May 20, 2005 || Mount Lemmon || Mount Lemmon Survey || GEF || align=right | 1.7 km || 
|-id=260 bgcolor=#E9E9E9
| 601260 ||  || — || December 2, 2008 || Kitt Peak || Spacewatch ||  || align=right | 2.3 km || 
|-id=261 bgcolor=#E9E9E9
| 601261 ||  || — || October 4, 2002 || Palomar || NEAT ||  || align=right | 2.5 km || 
|-id=262 bgcolor=#d6d6d6
| 601262 ||  || — || January 10, 2013 || Haleakala || Pan-STARRS ||  || align=right | 2.3 km || 
|-id=263 bgcolor=#d6d6d6
| 601263 ||  || — || January 13, 2008 || Mount Lemmon || Mount Lemmon Survey ||  || align=right | 2.0 km || 
|-id=264 bgcolor=#d6d6d6
| 601264 ||  || — || December 5, 2007 || Mount Lemmon || Mount Lemmon Survey ||  || align=right | 1.8 km || 
|-id=265 bgcolor=#d6d6d6
| 601265 ||  || — || January 13, 2013 || Mount Lemmon || Mount Lemmon Survey ||  || align=right | 2.9 km || 
|-id=266 bgcolor=#d6d6d6
| 601266 ||  || — || July 30, 2005 || Palomar || NEAT ||  || align=right | 3.2 km || 
|-id=267 bgcolor=#E9E9E9
| 601267 ||  || — || January 14, 2013 || ESA OGS || ESA OGS ||  || align=right | 2.5 km || 
|-id=268 bgcolor=#E9E9E9
| 601268 ||  || — || February 28, 2009 || Kitt Peak || Spacewatch ||  || align=right | 2.4 km || 
|-id=269 bgcolor=#E9E9E9
| 601269 ||  || — || December 8, 2012 || Kitt Peak || Spacewatch ||  || align=right | 2.0 km || 
|-id=270 bgcolor=#E9E9E9
| 601270 ||  || — || January 7, 2013 || Haleakala || Pan-STARRS ||  || align=right | 1.7 km || 
|-id=271 bgcolor=#C2FFFF
| 601271 ||  || — || January 10, 2013 || Haleakala || Pan-STARRS || L4 || align=right | 9.1 km || 
|-id=272 bgcolor=#C2FFFF
| 601272 ||  || — || January 10, 2013 || Haleakala || Pan-STARRS || L4 || align=right | 9.5 km || 
|-id=273 bgcolor=#E9E9E9
| 601273 ||  || — || November 7, 2012 || Mount Lemmon || Mount Lemmon Survey ||  || align=right | 1.6 km || 
|-id=274 bgcolor=#C2FFFF
| 601274 ||  || — || January 10, 2013 || Haleakala || Pan-STARRS || L4 || align=right | 6.6 km || 
|-id=275 bgcolor=#C2FFFF
| 601275 ||  || — || January 10, 2013 || Haleakala || Pan-STARRS || L4ERY || align=right | 8.4 km || 
|-id=276 bgcolor=#fefefe
| 601276 ||  || — || March 26, 2003 || Kitt Peak || Spacewatch ||  || align=right data-sort-value="0.81" | 810 m || 
|-id=277 bgcolor=#E9E9E9
| 601277 ||  || — || March 16, 2009 || Mount Lemmon || Mount Lemmon Survey ||  || align=right | 1.1 km || 
|-id=278 bgcolor=#d6d6d6
| 601278 ||  || — || September 18, 2011 || Mount Lemmon || Mount Lemmon Survey ||  || align=right | 1.9 km || 
|-id=279 bgcolor=#d6d6d6
| 601279 ||  || — || January 4, 2013 || Cerro Tololo-DECam || CTIO-DECam ||  || align=right | 1.9 km || 
|-id=280 bgcolor=#d6d6d6
| 601280 ||  || — || February 10, 2013 || Haleakala || Pan-STARRS ||  || align=right | 2.1 km || 
|-id=281 bgcolor=#E9E9E9
| 601281 ||  || — || August 29, 2006 || Kitt Peak || Spacewatch ||  || align=right | 1.4 km || 
|-id=282 bgcolor=#C2FFFF
| 601282 ||  || — || October 17, 2010 || Mount Lemmon || Mount Lemmon Survey || L4 || align=right | 6.3 km || 
|-id=283 bgcolor=#E9E9E9
| 601283 ||  || — || February 10, 2013 || Haleakala || Pan-STARRS ||  || align=right | 1.3 km || 
|-id=284 bgcolor=#FA8072
| 601284 ||  || — || March 7, 2003 || Socorro || LINEAR ||  || align=right data-sort-value="0.52" | 520 m || 
|-id=285 bgcolor=#C2FFFF
| 601285 ||  || — || January 10, 2013 || Haleakala || Pan-STARRS || L4 || align=right | 8.1 km || 
|-id=286 bgcolor=#d6d6d6
| 601286 ||  || — || November 2, 2011 || Mount Lemmon || Mount Lemmon Survey ||  || align=right | 2.2 km || 
|-id=287 bgcolor=#E9E9E9
| 601287 ||  || — || January 31, 2009 || Mount Lemmon || Mount Lemmon Survey ||  || align=right | 1.7 km || 
|-id=288 bgcolor=#E9E9E9
| 601288 ||  || — || January 5, 2013 || Mount Lemmon || Mount Lemmon Survey ||  || align=right | 2.0 km || 
|-id=289 bgcolor=#d6d6d6
| 601289 ||  || — || October 11, 2016 || Mount Lemmon || Mount Lemmon Survey ||  || align=right | 2.5 km || 
|-id=290 bgcolor=#E9E9E9
| 601290 ||  || — || October 28, 2016 || Haleakala || Pan-STARRS ||  || align=right | 1.1 km || 
|-id=291 bgcolor=#d6d6d6
| 601291 ||  || — || January 9, 2013 || Siding Spring || SSS || Tj (2.95) || align=right | 2.6 km || 
|-id=292 bgcolor=#C2FFFF
| 601292 ||  || — || January 10, 2013 || Kitt Peak || Spacewatch || L4 || align=right | 9.1 km || 
|-id=293 bgcolor=#C2FFFF
| 601293 ||  || — || January 5, 2013 || Kitt Peak || Spacewatch || L4 || align=right | 7.3 km || 
|-id=294 bgcolor=#C2FFFF
| 601294 ||  || — || January 10, 2013 || Haleakala || Pan-STARRS || L4 || align=right | 6.2 km || 
|-id=295 bgcolor=#E9E9E9
| 601295 ||  || — || December 7, 2012 || Mount Lemmon || Mount Lemmon Survey ||  || align=right data-sort-value="0.93" | 930 m || 
|-id=296 bgcolor=#d6d6d6
| 601296 ||  || — || January 14, 2013 || Mount Lemmon || Mount Lemmon Survey ||  || align=right | 2.1 km || 
|-id=297 bgcolor=#C2FFFF
| 601297 ||  || — || January 5, 2013 || Kitt Peak || Spacewatch || L4 || align=right | 6.6 km || 
|-id=298 bgcolor=#C2FFFF
| 601298 ||  || — || January 10, 2013 || Haleakala || Pan-STARRS || L4 || align=right | 6.0 km || 
|-id=299 bgcolor=#C2FFFF
| 601299 ||  || — || January 9, 2013 || Kitt Peak || Spacewatch || L4 || align=right | 6.8 km || 
|-id=300 bgcolor=#C2FFFF
| 601300 ||  || — || January 10, 2013 || Haleakala || Pan-STARRS || L4 || align=right | 6.0 km || 
|}

601301–601400 

|-bgcolor=#C2FFFF
| 601301 ||  || — || September 28, 2009 || Mount Lemmon || Mount Lemmon Survey || L4 || align=right | 6.7 km || 
|-id=302 bgcolor=#C2FFFF
| 601302 ||  || — || February 27, 2015 || Haleakala || Pan-STARRS || L4(8060) || align=right | 5.5 km || 
|-id=303 bgcolor=#fefefe
| 601303 ||  || — || December 12, 2012 || Kitt Peak || Spacewatch || H || align=right data-sort-value="0.81" | 810 m || 
|-id=304 bgcolor=#C2FFFF
| 601304 ||  || — || October 11, 2010 || Mount Lemmon || Mount Lemmon Survey || L4 || align=right | 6.6 km || 
|-id=305 bgcolor=#C2FFFF
| 601305 ||  || — || December 8, 2012 || Kitt Peak || Spacewatch || L4 || align=right | 7.4 km || 
|-id=306 bgcolor=#C2FFFF
| 601306 ||  || — || December 23, 2012 || Haleakala || Pan-STARRS || L4ERY || align=right | 5.7 km || 
|-id=307 bgcolor=#fefefe
| 601307 ||  || — || December 7, 2012 || Mount Lemmon || Mount Lemmon Survey || H || align=right data-sort-value="0.51" | 510 m || 
|-id=308 bgcolor=#d6d6d6
| 601308 ||  || — || September 25, 2011 || Haleakala || Pan-STARRS ||  || align=right | 2.5 km || 
|-id=309 bgcolor=#d6d6d6
| 601309 ||  || — || October 18, 2012 || Haleakala || Pan-STARRS ||  || align=right | 2.6 km || 
|-id=310 bgcolor=#E9E9E9
| 601310 ||  || — || April 29, 2011 || Kitt Peak || Spacewatch ||  || align=right data-sort-value="0.93" | 930 m || 
|-id=311 bgcolor=#C2FFFF
| 601311 ||  || — || May 14, 2005 || Kitt Peak || Spacewatch || L4 || align=right | 14 km || 
|-id=312 bgcolor=#C2FFFF
| 601312 ||  || — || January 16, 2013 || Mount Lemmon || Mount Lemmon Survey || L4 || align=right | 6.6 km || 
|-id=313 bgcolor=#E9E9E9
| 601313 ||  || — || September 23, 2011 || Haleakala || Pan-STARRS ||  || align=right | 2.0 km || 
|-id=314 bgcolor=#C2FFFF
| 601314 ||  || — || January 17, 2013 || Haleakala || Pan-STARRS || L4 || align=right | 7.5 km || 
|-id=315 bgcolor=#E9E9E9
| 601315 ||  || — || May 4, 2005 || Kitt Peak || Spacewatch ||  || align=right | 3.1 km || 
|-id=316 bgcolor=#d6d6d6
| 601316 ||  || — || July 31, 2000 || Cerro Tololo || M. W. Buie, S. D. Kern ||  || align=right | 1.9 km || 
|-id=317 bgcolor=#C2FFFF
| 601317 ||  || — || January 10, 2013 || Haleakala || Pan-STARRS || L4 || align=right | 6.7 km || 
|-id=318 bgcolor=#C2FFFF
| 601318 ||  || — || January 18, 2013 || Mount Lemmon || Mount Lemmon Survey || L4 || align=right | 8.7 km || 
|-id=319 bgcolor=#d6d6d6
| 601319 ||  || — || January 16, 2013 || Haleakala || Pan-STARRS ||  || align=right | 1.5 km || 
|-id=320 bgcolor=#E9E9E9
| 601320 ||  || — || August 28, 2006 || Kitt Peak || Spacewatch ||  || align=right | 2.2 km || 
|-id=321 bgcolor=#C2FFFF
| 601321 ||  || — || January 16, 2013 || Haleakala || Pan-STARRS || L4 || align=right | 6.3 km || 
|-id=322 bgcolor=#E9E9E9
| 601322 ||  || — || December 5, 2007 || Mount Lemmon || Mount Lemmon Survey ||  || align=right | 2.2 km || 
|-id=323 bgcolor=#C2FFFF
| 601323 ||  || — || January 5, 2013 || Mount Lemmon || Mount Lemmon Survey || L4 || align=right | 6.2 km || 
|-id=324 bgcolor=#d6d6d6
| 601324 ||  || — || October 21, 2005 || Palomar || NEAT ||  || align=right | 3.3 km || 
|-id=325 bgcolor=#C2FFFF
| 601325 ||  || — || January 17, 2013 || Haleakala || Pan-STARRS || L4 || align=right | 9.8 km || 
|-id=326 bgcolor=#E9E9E9
| 601326 ||  || — || October 20, 2011 || Haleakala || Pan-STARRS ||  || align=right | 2.4 km || 
|-id=327 bgcolor=#E9E9E9
| 601327 ||  || — || October 28, 2011 || Mount Lemmon || Mount Lemmon Survey ||  || align=right | 1.3 km || 
|-id=328 bgcolor=#E9E9E9
| 601328 ||  || — || September 3, 2002 || Palomar || NEAT ||  || align=right | 2.8 km || 
|-id=329 bgcolor=#C2FFFF
| 601329 ||  || — || September 18, 2009 || Kitt Peak || Spacewatch || L4 || align=right | 5.8 km || 
|-id=330 bgcolor=#d6d6d6
| 601330 ||  || — || January 16, 2013 || Mount Lemmon || Mount Lemmon Survey ||  || align=right | 2.4 km || 
|-id=331 bgcolor=#E9E9E9
| 601331 ||  || — || January 16, 2013 || Mount Lemmon || Mount Lemmon Survey ||  || align=right | 1.2 km || 
|-id=332 bgcolor=#d6d6d6
| 601332 ||  || — || January 17, 2013 || Kitt Peak || Spacewatch ||  || align=right | 2.7 km || 
|-id=333 bgcolor=#E9E9E9
| 601333 ||  || — || January 19, 2013 || Mount Lemmon || Mount Lemmon Survey ||  || align=right | 1.4 km || 
|-id=334 bgcolor=#d6d6d6
| 601334 ||  || — || October 19, 2016 || Mount Lemmon || Mount Lemmon Survey ||  || align=right | 2.0 km || 
|-id=335 bgcolor=#d6d6d6
| 601335 ||  || — || January 22, 2013 || Kitt Peak || Spacewatch ||  || align=right | 2.3 km || 
|-id=336 bgcolor=#E9E9E9
| 601336 ||  || — || January 17, 2013 || Haleakala || Pan-STARRS ||  || align=right | 2.0 km || 
|-id=337 bgcolor=#d6d6d6
| 601337 ||  || — || January 17, 2013 || Kitt Peak || Spacewatch ||  || align=right | 2.5 km || 
|-id=338 bgcolor=#d6d6d6
| 601338 ||  || — || January 17, 2013 || Mount Lemmon || Mount Lemmon Survey ||  || align=right | 2.2 km || 
|-id=339 bgcolor=#d6d6d6
| 601339 ||  || — || January 17, 2013 || Kitt Peak || Spacewatch ||  || align=right | 2.0 km || 
|-id=340 bgcolor=#C2FFFF
| 601340 ||  || — || January 18, 2013 || Kitt Peak || Spacewatch || L4 || align=right | 8.3 km || 
|-id=341 bgcolor=#C2FFFF
| 601341 ||  || — || January 22, 2013 || Mount Lemmon || Mount Lemmon Survey || L4 || align=right | 7.5 km || 
|-id=342 bgcolor=#d6d6d6
| 601342 ||  || — || January 17, 2013 || Haleakala || Pan-STARRS ||  || align=right | 1.8 km || 
|-id=343 bgcolor=#d6d6d6
| 601343 ||  || — || January 15, 2008 || Kitt Peak || Spacewatch ||  || align=right | 2.3 km || 
|-id=344 bgcolor=#d6d6d6
| 601344 ||  || — || January 17, 2013 || Haleakala || Pan-STARRS ||  || align=right | 2.1 km || 
|-id=345 bgcolor=#fefefe
| 601345 ||  || — || February 2, 2013 || Mount Lemmon || Mount Lemmon Survey ||  || align=right data-sort-value="0.57" | 570 m || 
|-id=346 bgcolor=#E9E9E9
| 601346 ||  || — || January 9, 2013 || Kitt Peak || Spacewatch ||  || align=right | 1.3 km || 
|-id=347 bgcolor=#C2FFFF
| 601347 ||  || — || September 11, 2007 || Mount Lemmon || Mount Lemmon Survey || L4 || align=right | 10 km || 
|-id=348 bgcolor=#d6d6d6
| 601348 ||  || — || January 31, 2008 || Mount Lemmon || Mount Lemmon Survey ||  || align=right | 1.5 km || 
|-id=349 bgcolor=#d6d6d6
| 601349 ||  || — || February 9, 2008 || Kitt Peak || Spacewatch ||  || align=right | 2.2 km || 
|-id=350 bgcolor=#d6d6d6
| 601350 ||  || — || February 1, 2013 || Kitt Peak || Spacewatch || Tj (2.97) || align=right | 2.2 km || 
|-id=351 bgcolor=#C2FFFF
| 601351 ||  || — || February 3, 2013 || Haleakala || Pan-STARRS || L4 || align=right | 7.1 km || 
|-id=352 bgcolor=#C2FFFF
| 601352 ||  || — || January 6, 2013 || Kitt Peak || Spacewatch || L4 || align=right | 7.9 km || 
|-id=353 bgcolor=#E9E9E9
| 601353 ||  || — || February 5, 2013 || Oukaimeden || C. Rinner ||  || align=right | 2.0 km || 
|-id=354 bgcolor=#d6d6d6
| 601354 ||  || — || February 4, 2013 || Calar Alto-CASADO || S. Mottola ||  || align=right | 2.2 km || 
|-id=355 bgcolor=#fefefe
| 601355 ||  || — || October 1, 2005 || Mount Lemmon || Mount Lemmon Survey ||  || align=right data-sort-value="0.48" | 480 m || 
|-id=356 bgcolor=#E9E9E9
| 601356 ||  || — || January 20, 2013 || Mount Lemmon || Mount Lemmon Survey ||  || align=right | 1.1 km || 
|-id=357 bgcolor=#E9E9E9
| 601357 ||  || — || August 24, 2011 || Haleakala || Pan-STARRS ||  || align=right | 2.7 km || 
|-id=358 bgcolor=#d6d6d6
| 601358 ||  || — || February 6, 2013 || Catalina || CSS ||  || align=right | 2.9 km || 
|-id=359 bgcolor=#d6d6d6
| 601359 ||  || — || January 10, 2013 || Haleakala || Pan-STARRS ||  || align=right | 1.9 km || 
|-id=360 bgcolor=#C2FFFF
| 601360 ||  || — || January 10, 2013 || Haleakala || Pan-STARRS || L4 || align=right | 7.7 km || 
|-id=361 bgcolor=#E9E9E9
| 601361 ||  || — || August 13, 2010 || Kitt Peak || Spacewatch ||  || align=right | 2.6 km || 
|-id=362 bgcolor=#d6d6d6
| 601362 ||  || — || August 24, 2005 || Palomar || NEAT || EUP || align=right | 3.4 km || 
|-id=363 bgcolor=#E9E9E9
| 601363 ||  || — || August 12, 2002 || Cerro Tololo || M. W. Buie, S. D. Kern ||  || align=right | 2.0 km || 
|-id=364 bgcolor=#fefefe
| 601364 ||  || — || February 8, 2013 || Haleakala || Pan-STARRS ||  || align=right data-sort-value="0.58" | 580 m || 
|-id=365 bgcolor=#d6d6d6
| 601365 ||  || — || March 12, 2008 || Kitt Peak || Spacewatch ||  || align=right | 2.5 km || 
|-id=366 bgcolor=#d6d6d6
| 601366 ||  || — || January 19, 2013 || Kitt Peak || Spacewatch ||  || align=right | 1.8 km || 
|-id=367 bgcolor=#d6d6d6
| 601367 ||  || — || October 25, 2011 || Haleakala || Pan-STARRS ||  || align=right | 2.3 km || 
|-id=368 bgcolor=#E9E9E9
| 601368 ||  || — || March 1, 2009 || Kitt Peak || Spacewatch ||  || align=right | 1.1 km || 
|-id=369 bgcolor=#d6d6d6
| 601369 ||  || — || February 8, 2013 || Haleakala || Pan-STARRS ||  || align=right | 2.5 km || 
|-id=370 bgcolor=#E9E9E9
| 601370 ||  || — || January 6, 2013 || Kitt Peak || Spacewatch ||  || align=right | 1.2 km || 
|-id=371 bgcolor=#d6d6d6
| 601371 ||  || — || September 6, 2010 || Piszkesteto || Z. Kuli || 7:4 || align=right | 3.2 km || 
|-id=372 bgcolor=#fefefe
| 601372 ||  || — || March 18, 2010 || Mount Lemmon || Mount Lemmon Survey ||  || align=right data-sort-value="0.50" | 500 m || 
|-id=373 bgcolor=#fefefe
| 601373 ||  || — || February 8, 2013 || Haleakala || Pan-STARRS ||  || align=right data-sort-value="0.47" | 470 m || 
|-id=374 bgcolor=#E9E9E9
| 601374 ||  || — || March 29, 2009 || Catalina || CSS ||  || align=right | 1.2 km || 
|-id=375 bgcolor=#FA8072
| 601375 ||  || — || January 19, 2013 || Kitt Peak || Spacewatch ||  || align=right data-sort-value="0.62" | 620 m || 
|-id=376 bgcolor=#C2FFFF
| 601376 ||  || — || December 26, 2011 || Kitt Peak || Spacewatch || L4 || align=right | 7.7 km || 
|-id=377 bgcolor=#C2FFFF
| 601377 ||  || — || February 9, 2013 || Haleakala || Pan-STARRS || L4 || align=right | 6.2 km || 
|-id=378 bgcolor=#d6d6d6
| 601378 ||  || — || January 20, 2013 || Kitt Peak || Spacewatch ||  || align=right | 2.4 km || 
|-id=379 bgcolor=#fefefe
| 601379 ||  || — || January 17, 2013 || Haleakala || Pan-STARRS ||  || align=right data-sort-value="0.45" | 450 m || 
|-id=380 bgcolor=#fefefe
| 601380 ||  || — || March 24, 2003 || Kitt Peak || Spacewatch ||  || align=right data-sort-value="0.53" | 530 m || 
|-id=381 bgcolor=#d6d6d6
| 601381 ||  || — || February 5, 2013 || Kitt Peak || Spacewatch ||  || align=right | 2.3 km || 
|-id=382 bgcolor=#d6d6d6
| 601382 ||  || — || March 6, 2008 || Bergisch Gladbach || W. Bickel ||  || align=right | 2.2 km || 
|-id=383 bgcolor=#d6d6d6
| 601383 ||  || — || February 8, 2013 || Kitt Peak || Spacewatch ||  || align=right | 2.5 km || 
|-id=384 bgcolor=#d6d6d6
| 601384 ||  || — || October 26, 2011 || Haleakala || Pan-STARRS ||  || align=right | 2.0 km || 
|-id=385 bgcolor=#fefefe
| 601385 ||  || — || February 1, 2013 || Kitt Peak || Spacewatch ||  || align=right data-sort-value="0.52" | 520 m || 
|-id=386 bgcolor=#d6d6d6
| 601386 ||  || — || March 6, 2008 || Mount Lemmon || Mount Lemmon Survey ||  || align=right | 2.5 km || 
|-id=387 bgcolor=#E9E9E9
| 601387 ||  || — || September 23, 2011 || Haleakala || Pan-STARRS ||  || align=right | 1.9 km || 
|-id=388 bgcolor=#E9E9E9
| 601388 ||  || — || September 26, 2011 || Mount Lemmon || Mount Lemmon Survey ||  || align=right data-sort-value="0.69" | 690 m || 
|-id=389 bgcolor=#E9E9E9
| 601389 ||  || — || January 14, 2008 || Kitt Peak || Spacewatch ||  || align=right | 2.2 km || 
|-id=390 bgcolor=#fefefe
| 601390 ||  || — || October 1, 2005 || Mount Lemmon || Mount Lemmon Survey ||  || align=right data-sort-value="0.43" | 430 m || 
|-id=391 bgcolor=#d6d6d6
| 601391 ||  || — || January 9, 2013 || Mount Lemmon || Mount Lemmon Survey ||  || align=right | 2.2 km || 
|-id=392 bgcolor=#C2FFFF
| 601392 ||  || — || December 27, 2011 || Kitt Peak || Spacewatch || L4 || align=right | 6.3 km || 
|-id=393 bgcolor=#d6d6d6
| 601393 ||  || — || January 19, 2013 || Mount Lemmon || Mount Lemmon Survey ||  || align=right | 1.9 km || 
|-id=394 bgcolor=#C2FFFF
| 601394 ||  || — || October 10, 2008 || Mount Lemmon || Mount Lemmon Survey || L4 || align=right | 6.5 km || 
|-id=395 bgcolor=#d6d6d6
| 601395 ||  || — || September 30, 2006 || Mount Lemmon || Mount Lemmon Survey ||  || align=right | 2.1 km || 
|-id=396 bgcolor=#E9E9E9
| 601396 ||  || — || February 14, 2013 || Haleakala || Pan-STARRS ||  || align=right | 1.6 km || 
|-id=397 bgcolor=#C2FFFF
| 601397 ||  || — || February 3, 2013 || Haleakala || Pan-STARRS || L4 || align=right | 6.1 km || 
|-id=398 bgcolor=#fefefe
| 601398 ||  || — || February 15, 2013 || Haleakala || Pan-STARRS ||  || align=right data-sort-value="0.52" | 520 m || 
|-id=399 bgcolor=#d6d6d6
| 601399 ||  || — || January 9, 2013 || Mount Lemmon || Mount Lemmon Survey ||  || align=right | 2.8 km || 
|-id=400 bgcolor=#d6d6d6
| 601400 ||  || — || May 28, 2008 || Siding Spring || SSS ||  || align=right | 2.3 km || 
|}

601401–601500 

|-bgcolor=#d6d6d6
| 601401 ||  || — || April 25, 2003 || Kitt Peak || Spacewatch ||  || align=right | 2.6 km || 
|-id=402 bgcolor=#E9E9E9
| 601402 ||  || — || January 21, 2004 || Socorro || LINEAR ||  || align=right | 2.4 km || 
|-id=403 bgcolor=#C2FFFF
| 601403 ||  || — || September 19, 2009 || Kitt Peak || Spacewatch || L4 || align=right | 7.9 km || 
|-id=404 bgcolor=#d6d6d6
| 601404 ||  || — || February 9, 2013 || Haleakala || Pan-STARRS ||  || align=right | 2.3 km || 
|-id=405 bgcolor=#d6d6d6
| 601405 ||  || — || November 27, 2000 || Haleakala || AMOS ||  || align=right | 3.4 km || 
|-id=406 bgcolor=#E9E9E9
| 601406 ||  || — || January 15, 2004 || Kitt Peak || Spacewatch || EUN || align=right | 1.4 km || 
|-id=407 bgcolor=#d6d6d6
| 601407 ||  || — || February 13, 2013 || Elena Remote || A. Oreshko ||  || align=right | 3.4 km || 
|-id=408 bgcolor=#C2FFFF
| 601408 ||  || — || September 23, 2008 || Mount Lemmon || Mount Lemmon Survey || L4 || align=right | 6.9 km || 
|-id=409 bgcolor=#d6d6d6
| 601409 ||  || — || February 9, 2013 || Haleakala || Pan-STARRS ||  || align=right | 2.2 km || 
|-id=410 bgcolor=#C2FFFF
| 601410 ||  || — || December 10, 2010 || Mount Lemmon || Mount Lemmon Survey || L4 || align=right | 6.5 km || 
|-id=411 bgcolor=#C2FFFF
| 601411 ||  || — || December 29, 2011 || Mount Lemmon || Mount Lemmon Survey || L4 || align=right | 8.4 km || 
|-id=412 bgcolor=#E9E9E9
| 601412 ||  || — || September 12, 2007 || Mount Lemmon || Mount Lemmon Survey ||  || align=right data-sort-value="0.63" | 630 m || 
|-id=413 bgcolor=#d6d6d6
| 601413 ||  || — || February 15, 2013 || Haleakala || Pan-STARRS ||  || align=right | 2.6 km || 
|-id=414 bgcolor=#E9E9E9
| 601414 ||  || — || April 5, 2000 || Kitt Peak || Spacewatch ||  || align=right | 1.8 km || 
|-id=415 bgcolor=#E9E9E9
| 601415 ||  || — || February 9, 2013 || Haleakala || Pan-STARRS ||  || align=right | 1.5 km || 
|-id=416 bgcolor=#C2FFFF
| 601416 ||  || — || January 19, 2013 || Kitt Peak || Spacewatch || L4 || align=right | 6.9 km || 
|-id=417 bgcolor=#d6d6d6
| 601417 ||  || — || August 26, 2000 || Cerro Tololo || R. Millis, L. H. Wasserman ||  || align=right | 2.2 km || 
|-id=418 bgcolor=#fefefe
| 601418 ||  || — || January 25, 2006 || Kitt Peak || Spacewatch ||  || align=right data-sort-value="0.62" | 620 m || 
|-id=419 bgcolor=#d6d6d6
| 601419 ||  || — || April 1, 2003 || Apache Point || SDSS Collaboration ||  || align=right | 2.5 km || 
|-id=420 bgcolor=#d6d6d6
| 601420 ||  || — || March 5, 2008 || Kitt Peak || Spacewatch ||  || align=right | 2.0 km || 
|-id=421 bgcolor=#d6d6d6
| 601421 ||  || — || February 8, 2013 || Haleakala || Pan-STARRS ||  || align=right | 1.8 km || 
|-id=422 bgcolor=#fefefe
| 601422 ||  || — || September 13, 2004 || Kitt Peak || Spacewatch ||  || align=right data-sort-value="0.66" | 660 m || 
|-id=423 bgcolor=#fefefe
| 601423 ||  || — || October 24, 2008 || Kitt Peak || Spacewatch ||  || align=right data-sort-value="0.52" | 520 m || 
|-id=424 bgcolor=#C2FFFF
| 601424 ||  || — || June 5, 2016 || Haleakala || Pan-STARRS || L4 || align=right | 5.4 km || 
|-id=425 bgcolor=#C2FFFF
| 601425 ||  || — || November 10, 2010 || Mount Lemmon || Mount Lemmon Survey || L4 || align=right | 6.9 km || 
|-id=426 bgcolor=#d6d6d6
| 601426 ||  || — || February 7, 2008 || Mount Lemmon || Mount Lemmon Survey ||  || align=right | 1.9 km || 
|-id=427 bgcolor=#d6d6d6
| 601427 ||  || — || February 8, 2013 || Haleakala || Pan-STARRS ||  || align=right | 2.2 km || 
|-id=428 bgcolor=#E9E9E9
| 601428 ||  || — || February 3, 2013 || Haleakala || Pan-STARRS ||  || align=right data-sort-value="0.76" | 760 m || 
|-id=429 bgcolor=#E9E9E9
| 601429 ||  || — || September 23, 2015 || Haleakala || Pan-STARRS ||  || align=right | 1.4 km || 
|-id=430 bgcolor=#E9E9E9
| 601430 ||  || — || July 23, 2015 || Haleakala || Pan-STARRS ||  || align=right | 1.9 km || 
|-id=431 bgcolor=#d6d6d6
| 601431 ||  || — || February 15, 2013 || Haleakala || Pan-STARRS ||  || align=right | 2.1 km || 
|-id=432 bgcolor=#d6d6d6
| 601432 ||  || — || February 6, 2013 || Kitt Peak || Spacewatch || 7:4 || align=right | 2.8 km || 
|-id=433 bgcolor=#C2FFFF
| 601433 ||  || — || April 2, 2016 || Haleakala || Pan-STARRS || L4 || align=right | 8.8 km || 
|-id=434 bgcolor=#C2FFFF
| 601434 ||  || — || April 3, 2016 || Haleakala || Pan-STARRS || L4 || align=right | 6.4 km || 
|-id=435 bgcolor=#d6d6d6
| 601435 ||  || — || May 4, 2014 || Haleakala || Pan-STARRS ||  || align=right | 1.9 km || 
|-id=436 bgcolor=#C2FFFF
| 601436 ||  || — || May 11, 2016 || Mount Lemmon || Mount Lemmon Survey || L4 || align=right | 6.4 km || 
|-id=437 bgcolor=#d6d6d6
| 601437 ||  || — || February 13, 2013 || Haleakala || Pan-STARRS ||  || align=right | 2.3 km || 
|-id=438 bgcolor=#C2FFFF
| 601438 ||  || — || February 14, 2013 || Mount Lemmon || Mount Lemmon Survey || L4 || align=right | 6.7 km || 
|-id=439 bgcolor=#d6d6d6
| 601439 ||  || — || February 8, 2013 || Haleakala || Pan-STARRS ||  || align=right | 2.0 km || 
|-id=440 bgcolor=#d6d6d6
| 601440 ||  || — || February 8, 2013 || Haleakala || Pan-STARRS ||  || align=right | 2.1 km || 
|-id=441 bgcolor=#C2FFFF
| 601441 ||  || — || February 5, 2013 || Kitt Peak || Spacewatch || L4 || align=right | 6.8 km || 
|-id=442 bgcolor=#C2FFFF
| 601442 ||  || — || February 3, 2013 || Haleakala || Pan-STARRS || L4 || align=right | 7.1 km || 
|-id=443 bgcolor=#C2FFFF
| 601443 ||  || — || February 9, 2013 || Haleakala || Pan-STARRS || L4 || align=right | 6.6 km || 
|-id=444 bgcolor=#d6d6d6
| 601444 ||  || — || February 15, 2013 || ESA OGS || ESA OGS ||  || align=right | 2.2 km || 
|-id=445 bgcolor=#E9E9E9
| 601445 ||  || — || February 14, 2013 || Haleakala || Pan-STARRS ||  || align=right | 1.6 km || 
|-id=446 bgcolor=#C2FFFF
| 601446 ||  || — || February 15, 2013 || Haleakala || Pan-STARRS || L4 || align=right | 6.0 km || 
|-id=447 bgcolor=#E9E9E9
| 601447 ||  || — || February 5, 2013 || Kitt Peak || Spacewatch ||  || align=right | 1.7 km || 
|-id=448 bgcolor=#E9E9E9
| 601448 ||  || — || February 14, 2013 || ESA OGS || ESA OGS ||  || align=right | 1.7 km || 
|-id=449 bgcolor=#fefefe
| 601449 ||  || — || August 28, 2011 || Haleakala || Pan-STARRS || H || align=right data-sort-value="0.67" | 670 m || 
|-id=450 bgcolor=#E9E9E9
| 601450 ||  || — || January 17, 2004 || Palomar || NEAT || 526 || align=right | 2.9 km || 
|-id=451 bgcolor=#d6d6d6
| 601451 ||  || — || February 16, 2013 || Mount Lemmon || Mount Lemmon Survey ||  || align=right | 2.3 km || 
|-id=452 bgcolor=#d6d6d6
| 601452 ||  || — || February 17, 2013 || Mount Lemmon || Mount Lemmon Survey ||  || align=right | 2.0 km || 
|-id=453 bgcolor=#d6d6d6
| 601453 ||  || — || February 18, 2013 || Kitt Peak || Spacewatch ||  || align=right | 2.1 km || 
|-id=454 bgcolor=#C2FFFF
| 601454 ||  || — || February 16, 2013 || Mount Lemmon || Mount Lemmon Survey || L4 || align=right | 7.5 km || 
|-id=455 bgcolor=#d6d6d6
| 601455 ||  || — || September 17, 2010 || Mount Lemmon || Mount Lemmon Survey ||  || align=right | 2.5 km || 
|-id=456 bgcolor=#fefefe
| 601456 ||  || — || January 23, 2006 || Mount Lemmon || Mount Lemmon Survey ||  || align=right data-sort-value="0.52" | 520 m || 
|-id=457 bgcolor=#fefefe
| 601457 ||  || — || March 7, 2013 || Haleakala || Pan-STARRS || H || align=right data-sort-value="0.48" | 480 m || 
|-id=458 bgcolor=#d6d6d6
| 601458 ||  || — || March 7, 2013 || Kitt Peak || Spacewatch ||  || align=right | 3.4 km || 
|-id=459 bgcolor=#d6d6d6
| 601459 ||  || — || September 16, 2004 || Kitt Peak || Spacewatch ||  || align=right | 2.1 km || 
|-id=460 bgcolor=#d6d6d6
| 601460 ||  || — || April 30, 2008 || Mount Lemmon || Mount Lemmon Survey ||  || align=right | 2.1 km || 
|-id=461 bgcolor=#d6d6d6
| 601461 ||  || — || November 24, 2011 || Haleakala || Pan-STARRS ||  || align=right | 2.0 km || 
|-id=462 bgcolor=#d6d6d6
| 601462 ||  || — || February 28, 2008 || Kitt Peak || Spacewatch ||  || align=right | 2.7 km || 
|-id=463 bgcolor=#d6d6d6
| 601463 ||  || — || January 1, 2012 || Mount Lemmon || Mount Lemmon Survey ||  || align=right | 2.2 km || 
|-id=464 bgcolor=#d6d6d6
| 601464 ||  || — || March 8, 2013 || Haleakala || Pan-STARRS ||  || align=right | 2.1 km || 
|-id=465 bgcolor=#d6d6d6
| 601465 ||  || — || March 6, 2013 || Haleakala || Pan-STARRS ||  || align=right | 2.3 km || 
|-id=466 bgcolor=#fefefe
| 601466 ||  || — || February 9, 2013 || Haleakala || Pan-STARRS ||  || align=right data-sort-value="0.59" | 590 m || 
|-id=467 bgcolor=#d6d6d6
| 601467 ||  || — || September 17, 2010 || Kitt Peak || Spacewatch ||  || align=right | 2.5 km || 
|-id=468 bgcolor=#d6d6d6
| 601468 ||  || — || March 8, 2013 || Haleakala || Pan-STARRS ||  || align=right | 2.1 km || 
|-id=469 bgcolor=#d6d6d6
| 601469 ||  || — || September 17, 2010 || Mount Lemmon || Mount Lemmon Survey ||  || align=right | 2.0 km || 
|-id=470 bgcolor=#d6d6d6
| 601470 ||  || — || March 8, 2013 || Haleakala || Pan-STARRS ||  || align=right | 2.1 km || 
|-id=471 bgcolor=#d6d6d6
| 601471 ||  || — || September 17, 2010 || Mount Lemmon || Mount Lemmon Survey ||  || align=right | 2.5 km || 
|-id=472 bgcolor=#d6d6d6
| 601472 ||  || — || March 11, 2013 || Palomar || PTF || Tj (2.99) || align=right | 2.1 km || 
|-id=473 bgcolor=#d6d6d6
| 601473 ||  || — || March 12, 2013 || Mount Lemmon || Mount Lemmon Survey ||  || align=right | 2.4 km || 
|-id=474 bgcolor=#d6d6d6
| 601474 ||  || — || September 2, 2010 || Mount Lemmon || Mount Lemmon Survey ||  || align=right | 2.2 km || 
|-id=475 bgcolor=#d6d6d6
| 601475 ||  || — || February 14, 2013 || Haleakala || Pan-STARRS ||  || align=right | 2.0 km || 
|-id=476 bgcolor=#d6d6d6
| 601476 ||  || — || March 8, 2013 || Haleakala || Pan-STARRS ||  || align=right | 2.1 km || 
|-id=477 bgcolor=#d6d6d6
| 601477 ||  || — || March 8, 2013 || Haleakala || Pan-STARRS ||  || align=right | 1.9 km || 
|-id=478 bgcolor=#d6d6d6
| 601478 ||  || — || March 8, 2013 || Haleakala || Pan-STARRS ||  || align=right | 1.9 km || 
|-id=479 bgcolor=#d6d6d6
| 601479 ||  || — || March 3, 2013 || Kitt Peak || Spacewatch || Tj (2.96) || align=right | 2.9 km || 
|-id=480 bgcolor=#d6d6d6
| 601480 ||  || — || February 17, 2013 || Mount Lemmon || Mount Lemmon Survey ||  || align=right | 1.7 km || 
|-id=481 bgcolor=#d6d6d6
| 601481 ||  || — || March 8, 2013 || Haleakala || Pan-STARRS ||  || align=right | 2.2 km || 
|-id=482 bgcolor=#d6d6d6
| 601482 ||  || — || August 29, 2009 || Kitt Peak || Spacewatch ||  || align=right | 2.7 km || 
|-id=483 bgcolor=#d6d6d6
| 601483 ||  || — || March 12, 2013 || Palomar || PTF ||  || align=right | 2.4 km || 
|-id=484 bgcolor=#fefefe
| 601484 ||  || — || May 31, 2010 || Catalina || CSS ||  || align=right data-sort-value="0.78" | 780 m || 
|-id=485 bgcolor=#d6d6d6
| 601485 ||  || — || February 18, 2013 || Catalina || CSS ||  || align=right | 2.4 km || 
|-id=486 bgcolor=#d6d6d6
| 601486 ||  || — || May 2, 2003 || Kitt Peak || Spacewatch ||  || align=right | 2.1 km || 
|-id=487 bgcolor=#d6d6d6
| 601487 ||  || — || October 22, 2003 || Apache Point || SDSS Collaboration || 7:4 || align=right | 3.9 km || 
|-id=488 bgcolor=#fefefe
| 601488 ||  || — || March 13, 2013 || Palomar || PTF ||  || align=right data-sort-value="0.79" | 790 m || 
|-id=489 bgcolor=#d6d6d6
| 601489 ||  || — || May 9, 2002 || Palomar || NEAT || EUP || align=right | 2.4 km || 
|-id=490 bgcolor=#d6d6d6
| 601490 ||  || — || February 14, 2013 || Haleakala || Pan-STARRS ||  || align=right | 2.5 km || 
|-id=491 bgcolor=#d6d6d6
| 601491 ||  || — || February 15, 2013 || Haleakala || Pan-STARRS ||  || align=right | 3.1 km || 
|-id=492 bgcolor=#fefefe
| 601492 ||  || — || March 30, 2003 || Kitt Peak || M. W. Buie, A. B. Jordan ||  || align=right data-sort-value="0.58" | 580 m || 
|-id=493 bgcolor=#d6d6d6
| 601493 ||  || — || March 13, 2013 || Palomar || PTF ||  || align=right | 2.8 km || 
|-id=494 bgcolor=#d6d6d6
| 601494 ||  || — || March 15, 2013 || Mount Lemmon || Mount Lemmon Survey ||  || align=right | 2.4 km || 
|-id=495 bgcolor=#d6d6d6
| 601495 ||  || — || March 11, 2013 || Nogales || M. Schwartz, P. R. Holvorcem ||  || align=right | 3.4 km || 
|-id=496 bgcolor=#fefefe
| 601496 ||  || — || February 27, 2006 || Kitt Peak || Spacewatch ||  || align=right data-sort-value="0.55" | 550 m || 
|-id=497 bgcolor=#d6d6d6
| 601497 ||  || — || February 14, 2013 || Mount Lemmon || Mount Lemmon Survey ||  || align=right | 1.9 km || 
|-id=498 bgcolor=#fefefe
| 601498 ||  || — || April 9, 2010 || Mount Lemmon || Mount Lemmon Survey ||  || align=right data-sort-value="0.61" | 610 m || 
|-id=499 bgcolor=#C2FFFF
| 601499 ||  || — || September 28, 2009 || Mount Lemmon || Mount Lemmon Survey || L4 || align=right | 5.7 km || 
|-id=500 bgcolor=#d6d6d6
| 601500 ||  || — || April 15, 2008 || Mount Lemmon || Mount Lemmon Survey ||  || align=right | 2.1 km || 
|}

601501–601600 

|-bgcolor=#d6d6d6
| 601501 ||  || — || March 13, 2013 || Kitt Peak || Spacewatch ||  || align=right | 2.3 km || 
|-id=502 bgcolor=#d6d6d6
| 601502 ||  || — || October 10, 2015 || Oukaimeden || M. Ory ||  || align=right | 3.4 km || 
|-id=503 bgcolor=#d6d6d6
| 601503 ||  || — || January 10, 2007 || Kitt Peak || Spacewatch ||  || align=right | 2.5 km || 
|-id=504 bgcolor=#d6d6d6
| 601504 ||  || — || March 5, 2013 || Mount Lemmon || Mount Lemmon Survey ||  || align=right | 2.0 km || 
|-id=505 bgcolor=#fefefe
| 601505 ||  || — || March 14, 2013 || Kitt Peak || Spacewatch ||  || align=right data-sort-value="0.68" | 680 m || 
|-id=506 bgcolor=#fefefe
| 601506 ||  || — || October 29, 2008 || Kitt Peak || Spacewatch ||  || align=right data-sort-value="0.55" | 550 m || 
|-id=507 bgcolor=#d6d6d6
| 601507 ||  || — || March 13, 2013 || Haleakala || Pan-STARRS ||  || align=right | 1.9 km || 
|-id=508 bgcolor=#d6d6d6
| 601508 ||  || — || March 5, 2013 || Mount Lemmon || Mount Lemmon Survey ||  || align=right | 2.1 km || 
|-id=509 bgcolor=#fefefe
| 601509 ||  || — || March 6, 2013 || Haleakala || Pan-STARRS ||  || align=right data-sort-value="0.58" | 580 m || 
|-id=510 bgcolor=#fefefe
| 601510 ||  || — || March 13, 2013 || Haleakala || Pan-STARRS ||  || align=right data-sort-value="0.55" | 550 m || 
|-id=511 bgcolor=#d6d6d6
| 601511 ||  || — || March 5, 2013 || Mount Lemmon || Mount Lemmon Survey ||  || align=right | 2.1 km || 
|-id=512 bgcolor=#d6d6d6
| 601512 ||  || — || March 8, 2013 || Haleakala || Pan-STARRS ||  || align=right | 2.0 km || 
|-id=513 bgcolor=#d6d6d6
| 601513 ||  || — || March 8, 2013 || Haleakala || Pan-STARRS ||  || align=right | 2.1 km || 
|-id=514 bgcolor=#C2FFFF
| 601514 ||  || — || September 4, 2008 || Kitt Peak || Spacewatch || L4 || align=right | 8.4 km || 
|-id=515 bgcolor=#d6d6d6
| 601515 ||  || — || February 14, 2013 || Mount Lemmon || Mount Lemmon Survey ||  || align=right | 2.4 km || 
|-id=516 bgcolor=#fefefe
| 601516 ||  || — || March 20, 2013 || Haleakala || Pan-STARRS || H || align=right data-sort-value="0.65" | 650 m || 
|-id=517 bgcolor=#d6d6d6
| 601517 ||  || — || April 21, 2002 || Palomar || NEAT || TIR || align=right | 2.8 km || 
|-id=518 bgcolor=#d6d6d6
| 601518 ||  || — || October 25, 2011 || Haleakala || Pan-STARRS ||  || align=right | 2.3 km || 
|-id=519 bgcolor=#fefefe
| 601519 ||  || — || March 26, 2006 || Mount Lemmon || Mount Lemmon Survey ||  || align=right data-sort-value="0.57" | 570 m || 
|-id=520 bgcolor=#fefefe
| 601520 ||  || — || April 24, 2006 || Kitt Peak || Spacewatch ||  || align=right data-sort-value="0.56" | 560 m || 
|-id=521 bgcolor=#d6d6d6
| 601521 ||  || — || March 31, 2013 || Mount Lemmon || Mount Lemmon Survey ||  || align=right | 2.1 km || 
|-id=522 bgcolor=#d6d6d6
| 601522 ||  || — || March 13, 2013 || Haleakala || Pan-STARRS ||  || align=right | 2.3 km || 
|-id=523 bgcolor=#d6d6d6
| 601523 ||  || — || April 3, 2013 || Palomar || PTF ||  || align=right | 3.2 km || 
|-id=524 bgcolor=#d6d6d6
| 601524 ||  || — || November 30, 2011 || Mount Lemmon || Mount Lemmon Survey ||  || align=right | 1.7 km || 
|-id=525 bgcolor=#d6d6d6
| 601525 ||  || — || March 19, 2002 || Anderson Mesa || LONEOS ||  || align=right | 2.3 km || 
|-id=526 bgcolor=#d6d6d6
| 601526 ||  || — || January 16, 2018 || Haleakala || Pan-STARRS ||  || align=right | 2.6 km || 
|-id=527 bgcolor=#d6d6d6
| 601527 ||  || — || March 16, 2013 || Kitt Peak || Spacewatch ||  || align=right | 2.4 km || 
|-id=528 bgcolor=#d6d6d6
| 601528 ||  || — || March 18, 2013 || Mount Lemmon || Mount Lemmon Survey ||  || align=right | 2.0 km || 
|-id=529 bgcolor=#fefefe
| 601529 ||  || — || March 19, 2013 || Haleakala || Pan-STARRS ||  || align=right data-sort-value="0.50" | 500 m || 
|-id=530 bgcolor=#d6d6d6
| 601530 ||  || — || March 16, 2013 || Kitt Peak || Spacewatch ||  || align=right | 1.7 km || 
|-id=531 bgcolor=#fefefe
| 601531 ||  || — || March 19, 2013 || Haleakala || Pan-STARRS ||  || align=right data-sort-value="0.60" | 600 m || 
|-id=532 bgcolor=#E9E9E9
| 601532 ||  || — || March 5, 2008 || Mount Lemmon || Mount Lemmon Survey ||  || align=right | 1.8 km || 
|-id=533 bgcolor=#fefefe
| 601533 ||  || — || March 13, 2013 || Kitt Peak || Spacewatch ||  || align=right data-sort-value="0.55" | 550 m || 
|-id=534 bgcolor=#d6d6d6
| 601534 ||  || — || April 1, 2013 || Kitt Peak || Spacewatch ||  || align=right | 2.6 km || 
|-id=535 bgcolor=#d6d6d6
| 601535 ||  || — || November 1, 2005 || Kitt Peak || Spacewatch ||  || align=right | 2.4 km || 
|-id=536 bgcolor=#fefefe
| 601536 ||  || — || December 5, 2005 || Mount Lemmon || Mount Lemmon Survey ||  || align=right data-sort-value="0.73" | 730 m || 
|-id=537 bgcolor=#fefefe
| 601537 ||  || — || July 8, 2003 || Palomar || NEAT ||  || align=right data-sort-value="0.80" | 800 m || 
|-id=538 bgcolor=#d6d6d6
| 601538 ||  || — || March 5, 2013 || Haleakala || Pan-STARRS ||  || align=right | 2.8 km || 
|-id=539 bgcolor=#d6d6d6
| 601539 ||  || — || May 4, 2008 || Kitt Peak || Spacewatch ||  || align=right | 2.6 km || 
|-id=540 bgcolor=#d6d6d6
| 601540 ||  || — || April 5, 2008 || Mount Lemmon || Mount Lemmon Survey ||  || align=right | 2.6 km || 
|-id=541 bgcolor=#fefefe
| 601541 ||  || — || August 23, 2001 || Kitt Peak || Spacewatch ||  || align=right data-sort-value="0.48" | 480 m || 
|-id=542 bgcolor=#d6d6d6
| 601542 ||  || — || March 8, 2013 || Haleakala || Pan-STARRS ||  || align=right | 2.3 km || 
|-id=543 bgcolor=#d6d6d6
| 601543 ||  || — || April 5, 2013 || Palomar || PTF ||  || align=right | 2.2 km || 
|-id=544 bgcolor=#fefefe
| 601544 ||  || — || March 21, 2013 || Elena Remote || A. Oreshko ||  || align=right data-sort-value="0.65" | 650 m || 
|-id=545 bgcolor=#d6d6d6
| 601545 ||  || — || April 2, 2013 || Mount Lemmon || Mount Lemmon Survey ||  || align=right | 2.7 km || 
|-id=546 bgcolor=#d6d6d6
| 601546 ||  || — || March 14, 2013 || Kitt Peak || Spacewatch ||  || align=right | 2.5 km || 
|-id=547 bgcolor=#d6d6d6
| 601547 ||  || — || March 23, 2013 || Palomar || PTF ||  || align=right | 2.7 km || 
|-id=548 bgcolor=#d6d6d6
| 601548 ||  || — || April 7, 2013 || Elena Remote || A. Oreshko ||  || align=right | 2.8 km || 
|-id=549 bgcolor=#d6d6d6
| 601549 ||  || — || April 21, 2002 || Palomar || NEAT ||  || align=right | 3.2 km || 
|-id=550 bgcolor=#d6d6d6
| 601550 ||  || — || April 6, 2013 || Kitt Peak || Spacewatch ||  || align=right | 2.8 km || 
|-id=551 bgcolor=#fefefe
| 601551 ||  || — || February 25, 2006 || Kitt Peak || Spacewatch ||  || align=right data-sort-value="0.55" | 550 m || 
|-id=552 bgcolor=#d6d6d6
| 601552 ||  || — || November 10, 2010 || Charleston || R. Holmes ||  || align=right | 3.3 km || 
|-id=553 bgcolor=#d6d6d6
| 601553 ||  || — || October 5, 2004 || Kitt Peak || Spacewatch ||  || align=right | 2.4 km || 
|-id=554 bgcolor=#d6d6d6
| 601554 ||  || — || April 8, 2013 || Mount Lemmon || Mount Lemmon Survey ||  || align=right | 2.0 km || 
|-id=555 bgcolor=#d6d6d6
| 601555 ||  || — || January 14, 2012 || Mount Lemmon || Mount Lemmon Survey ||  || align=right | 2.6 km || 
|-id=556 bgcolor=#fefefe
| 601556 ||  || — || March 18, 2013 || Kitt Peak || Spacewatch ||  || align=right data-sort-value="0.77" | 770 m || 
|-id=557 bgcolor=#fefefe
| 601557 ||  || — || January 2, 2009 || Mount Lemmon || Mount Lemmon Survey ||  || align=right data-sort-value="0.56" | 560 m || 
|-id=558 bgcolor=#fefefe
| 601558 ||  || — || March 24, 2006 || Kitt Peak || Spacewatch ||  || align=right data-sort-value="0.72" | 720 m || 
|-id=559 bgcolor=#fefefe
| 601559 ||  || — || March 16, 2013 || Kitt Peak || Spacewatch ||  || align=right data-sort-value="0.80" | 800 m || 
|-id=560 bgcolor=#d6d6d6
| 601560 ||  || — || October 12, 2010 || Bergisch Gladbach || W. Bickel ||  || align=right | 2.6 km || 
|-id=561 bgcolor=#d6d6d6
| 601561 ||  || — || April 7, 2013 || Mount Lemmon || Mount Lemmon Survey ||  || align=right | 2.4 km || 
|-id=562 bgcolor=#d6d6d6
| 601562 ||  || — || April 7, 2013 || Mount Lemmon || Mount Lemmon Survey ||  || align=right | 2.2 km || 
|-id=563 bgcolor=#d6d6d6
| 601563 ||  || — || April 1, 2008 || Kitt Peak || Spacewatch ||  || align=right | 2.1 km || 
|-id=564 bgcolor=#d6d6d6
| 601564 ||  || — || March 16, 2013 || Kitt Peak || Spacewatch ||  || align=right | 2.3 km || 
|-id=565 bgcolor=#d6d6d6
| 601565 ||  || — || March 5, 2013 || Mount Lemmon || Mount Lemmon Survey ||  || align=right | 1.8 km || 
|-id=566 bgcolor=#fefefe
| 601566 ||  || — || January 31, 2009 || Kitt Peak || Spacewatch ||  || align=right data-sort-value="0.73" | 730 m || 
|-id=567 bgcolor=#d6d6d6
| 601567 ||  || — || January 2, 2012 || Mount Lemmon || Mount Lemmon Survey ||  || align=right | 2.4 km || 
|-id=568 bgcolor=#fefefe
| 601568 ||  || — || March 19, 2013 || Haleakala || Pan-STARRS ||  || align=right data-sort-value="0.53" | 530 m || 
|-id=569 bgcolor=#d6d6d6
| 601569 ||  || — || April 30, 2008 || Mount Lemmon || Mount Lemmon Survey ||  || align=right | 2.6 km || 
|-id=570 bgcolor=#d6d6d6
| 601570 ||  || — || September 20, 2003 || Kitt Peak || Spacewatch ||  || align=right | 3.0 km || 
|-id=571 bgcolor=#fefefe
| 601571 ||  || — || April 15, 2013 || Haleakala || Pan-STARRS ||  || align=right data-sort-value="0.62" | 620 m || 
|-id=572 bgcolor=#E9E9E9
| 601572 ||  || — || February 10, 2008 || Catalina || CSS ||  || align=right | 2.1 km || 
|-id=573 bgcolor=#d6d6d6
| 601573 ||  || — || March 13, 2013 || Haleakala || Pan-STARRS ||  || align=right | 2.3 km || 
|-id=574 bgcolor=#E9E9E9
| 601574 ||  || — || December 17, 2007 || Kitt Peak || Spacewatch ||  || align=right | 1.5 km || 
|-id=575 bgcolor=#fefefe
| 601575 ||  || — || December 3, 2005 || Mauna Kea || Mauna Kea Obs. ||  || align=right data-sort-value="0.69" | 690 m || 
|-id=576 bgcolor=#d6d6d6
| 601576 ||  || — || March 15, 2013 || Kitt Peak || Spacewatch ||  || align=right | 2.3 km || 
|-id=577 bgcolor=#fefefe
| 601577 ||  || — || March 10, 2003 || Kitt Peak || Spacewatch ||  || align=right data-sort-value="0.65" | 650 m || 
|-id=578 bgcolor=#fefefe
| 601578 ||  || — || March 25, 2003 || Palomar || NEAT ||  || align=right data-sort-value="0.84" | 840 m || 
|-id=579 bgcolor=#d6d6d6
| 601579 ||  || — || March 6, 2008 || Mount Lemmon || Mount Lemmon Survey ||  || align=right | 3.3 km || 
|-id=580 bgcolor=#d6d6d6
| 601580 ||  || — || May 6, 2002 || Palomar || NEAT || LUT || align=right | 4.9 km || 
|-id=581 bgcolor=#d6d6d6
| 601581 ||  || — || September 1, 2010 || Mount Lemmon || Mount Lemmon Survey ||  || align=right | 2.3 km || 
|-id=582 bgcolor=#d6d6d6
| 601582 ||  || — || February 17, 2007 || Mount Lemmon || Mount Lemmon Survey ||  || align=right | 2.8 km || 
|-id=583 bgcolor=#d6d6d6
| 601583 ||  || — || November 25, 2005 || Kitt Peak || Spacewatch ||  || align=right | 2.6 km || 
|-id=584 bgcolor=#d6d6d6
| 601584 ||  || — || November 6, 2010 || Mount Lemmon || Mount Lemmon Survey ||  || align=right | 2.5 km || 
|-id=585 bgcolor=#d6d6d6
| 601585 ||  || — || October 7, 2004 || Kitt Peak || Spacewatch ||  || align=right | 2.8 km || 
|-id=586 bgcolor=#d6d6d6
| 601586 ||  || — || April 9, 2013 || Haleakala || Pan-STARRS ||  || align=right | 2.2 km || 
|-id=587 bgcolor=#fefefe
| 601587 ||  || — || June 20, 2010 || Mount Lemmon || Mount Lemmon Survey ||  || align=right | 1.1 km || 
|-id=588 bgcolor=#fefefe
| 601588 ||  || — || September 5, 2000 || Kitt Peak || Spacewatch ||  || align=right data-sort-value="0.92" | 920 m || 
|-id=589 bgcolor=#d6d6d6
| 601589 ||  || — || September 2, 2010 || Mount Lemmon || Mount Lemmon Survey ||  || align=right | 2.4 km || 
|-id=590 bgcolor=#d6d6d6
| 601590 ||  || — || September 6, 2015 || Kitt Peak || Spacewatch ||  || align=right | 2.4 km || 
|-id=591 bgcolor=#d6d6d6
| 601591 ||  || — || April 13, 2013 || Haleakala || Pan-STARRS ||  || align=right | 2.2 km || 
|-id=592 bgcolor=#fefefe
| 601592 ||  || — || April 13, 2013 || Haleakala || Pan-STARRS ||  || align=right data-sort-value="0.52" | 520 m || 
|-id=593 bgcolor=#fefefe
| 601593 ||  || — || April 14, 2013 || Haleakala || Pan-STARRS ||  || align=right data-sort-value="0.85" | 850 m || 
|-id=594 bgcolor=#d6d6d6
| 601594 ||  || — || September 12, 2015 || Haleakala || Pan-STARRS ||  || align=right | 2.4 km || 
|-id=595 bgcolor=#d6d6d6
| 601595 ||  || — || November 20, 2016 || Mount Lemmon || Mount Lemmon Survey ||  || align=right | 2.4 km || 
|-id=596 bgcolor=#fefefe
| 601596 ||  || — || April 15, 2013 || Haleakala || Pan-STARRS ||  || align=right data-sort-value="0.48" | 480 m || 
|-id=597 bgcolor=#d6d6d6
| 601597 ||  || — || April 15, 2013 || Haleakala || Pan-STARRS ||  || align=right | 2.7 km || 
|-id=598 bgcolor=#fefefe
| 601598 ||  || — || April 13, 2013 || Haleakala || Pan-STARRS ||  || align=right data-sort-value="0.57" | 570 m || 
|-id=599 bgcolor=#d6d6d6
| 601599 ||  || — || April 10, 2013 || Haleakala || Pan-STARRS ||  || align=right | 2.3 km || 
|-id=600 bgcolor=#d6d6d6
| 601600 ||  || — || April 18, 2013 || Palomar || PTF || Tj (2.99) || align=right | 3.0 km || 
|}

601601–601700 

|-bgcolor=#d6d6d6
| 601601 ||  || — || March 5, 2013 || Haleakala || Pan-STARRS ||  || align=right | 2.9 km || 
|-id=602 bgcolor=#fefefe
| 601602 ||  || — || April 5, 2000 || Kitt Peak || Spacewatch ||  || align=right data-sort-value="0.37" | 370 m || 
|-id=603 bgcolor=#fefefe
| 601603 ||  || — || January 1, 2009 || Mount Lemmon || Mount Lemmon Survey ||  || align=right data-sort-value="0.59" | 590 m || 
|-id=604 bgcolor=#d6d6d6
| 601604 ||  || — || April 15, 2013 || Catalina || CSS || Tj (2.99) || align=right | 3.4 km || 
|-id=605 bgcolor=#fefefe
| 601605 ||  || — || November 9, 2009 || Mount Lemmon || Mount Lemmon Survey || H || align=right data-sort-value="0.55" | 550 m || 
|-id=606 bgcolor=#E9E9E9
| 601606 ||  || — || April 21, 2013 || Catalina || CSS ||  || align=right | 1.4 km || 
|-id=607 bgcolor=#d6d6d6
| 601607 ||  || — || June 5, 2002 || Palomar || NEAT ||  || align=right | 3.2 km || 
|-id=608 bgcolor=#fefefe
| 601608 ||  || — || April 12, 2013 || Haleakala || Pan-STARRS ||  || align=right data-sort-value="0.57" | 570 m || 
|-id=609 bgcolor=#d6d6d6
| 601609 ||  || — || April 9, 2013 || Haleakala || Pan-STARRS ||  || align=right | 2.3 km || 
|-id=610 bgcolor=#fefefe
| 601610 ||  || — || October 15, 2007 || Altschwendt || W. Ries ||  || align=right data-sort-value="0.59" | 590 m || 
|-id=611 bgcolor=#d6d6d6
| 601611 ||  || — || September 27, 2005 || Kitt Peak || Spacewatch ||  || align=right | 1.7 km || 
|-id=612 bgcolor=#d6d6d6
| 601612 ||  || — || November 4, 2010 || Mount Lemmon || Mount Lemmon Survey ||  || align=right | 1.9 km || 
|-id=613 bgcolor=#d6d6d6
| 601613 ||  || — || January 18, 2012 || Mount Lemmon || Mount Lemmon Survey ||  || align=right | 1.9 km || 
|-id=614 bgcolor=#d6d6d6
| 601614 ||  || — || April 9, 2013 || Haleakala || Pan-STARRS ||  || align=right | 1.8 km || 
|-id=615 bgcolor=#d6d6d6
| 601615 ||  || — || December 14, 2010 || Mount Lemmon || Mount Lemmon Survey ||  || align=right | 2.6 km || 
|-id=616 bgcolor=#d6d6d6
| 601616 ||  || — || April 16, 2013 || Cerro Tololo-DECam || CTIO-DECam ||  || align=right | 1.6 km || 
|-id=617 bgcolor=#d6d6d6
| 601617 ||  || — || November 11, 2010 || Mount Lemmon || Mount Lemmon Survey ||  || align=right | 2.0 km || 
|-id=618 bgcolor=#fefefe
| 601618 ||  || — || September 22, 2011 || Kitt Peak || Spacewatch ||  || align=right data-sort-value="0.49" | 490 m || 
|-id=619 bgcolor=#d6d6d6
| 601619 ||  || — || April 9, 2013 || Haleakala || Pan-STARRS ||  || align=right | 1.5 km || 
|-id=620 bgcolor=#d6d6d6
| 601620 ||  || — || September 12, 2004 || Kitt Peak || Spacewatch ||  || align=right | 1.9 km || 
|-id=621 bgcolor=#fefefe
| 601621 ||  || — || April 16, 2013 || Cerro Tololo-DECam || CTIO-DECam ||  || align=right data-sort-value="0.50" | 500 m || 
|-id=622 bgcolor=#d6d6d6
| 601622 ||  || — || March 14, 2007 || Mount Lemmon || Mount Lemmon Survey ||  || align=right | 1.9 km || 
|-id=623 bgcolor=#d6d6d6
| 601623 ||  || — || October 6, 2004 || Kitt Peak || Spacewatch ||  || align=right | 2.3 km || 
|-id=624 bgcolor=#fefefe
| 601624 ||  || — || April 16, 2013 || Cerro Tololo-DECam || CTIO-DECam ||  || align=right data-sort-value="0.51" | 510 m || 
|-id=625 bgcolor=#fefefe
| 601625 ||  || — || October 12, 2007 || Mount Lemmon || Mount Lemmon Survey ||  || align=right data-sort-value="0.57" | 570 m || 
|-id=626 bgcolor=#d6d6d6
| 601626 ||  || — || April 16, 2013 || Cerro Tololo-DECam || CTIO-DECam ||  || align=right | 1.9 km || 
|-id=627 bgcolor=#d6d6d6
| 601627 ||  || — || March 14, 2007 || Mount Lemmon || Mount Lemmon Survey || EOS || align=right | 1.3 km || 
|-id=628 bgcolor=#d6d6d6
| 601628 ||  || — || April 13, 2002 || Kitt Peak || Spacewatch ||  || align=right | 2.0 km || 
|-id=629 bgcolor=#fefefe
| 601629 ||  || — || April 16, 2013 || Cerro Tololo-DECam || CTIO-DECam ||  || align=right data-sort-value="0.43" | 430 m || 
|-id=630 bgcolor=#d6d6d6
| 601630 ||  || — || September 17, 2010 || Mount Lemmon || Mount Lemmon Survey ||  || align=right | 2.1 km || 
|-id=631 bgcolor=#d6d6d6
| 601631 ||  || — || April 9, 2002 || Cerro Tololo || M. W. Buie, A. B. Jordan ||  || align=right | 1.8 km || 
|-id=632 bgcolor=#d6d6d6
| 601632 ||  || — || December 1, 2010 || Mount Lemmon || Mount Lemmon Survey ||  || align=right | 2.1 km || 
|-id=633 bgcolor=#d6d6d6
| 601633 ||  || — || October 30, 2010 || Mount Lemmon || Mount Lemmon Survey ||  || align=right | 2.4 km || 
|-id=634 bgcolor=#fefefe
| 601634 ||  || — || October 11, 2001 || Kitt Peak || Spacewatch ||  || align=right data-sort-value="0.67" | 670 m || 
|-id=635 bgcolor=#d6d6d6
| 601635 ||  || — || March 15, 2013 || Kitt Peak || Spacewatch ||  || align=right | 1.7 km || 
|-id=636 bgcolor=#d6d6d6
| 601636 ||  || — || March 17, 2013 || Mount Lemmon || Mount Lemmon Survey || Tj (2.98) || align=right | 2.3 km || 
|-id=637 bgcolor=#d6d6d6
| 601637 ||  || — || April 10, 2013 || Haleakala || Pan-STARRS ||  || align=right | 2.2 km || 
|-id=638 bgcolor=#d6d6d6
| 601638 ||  || — || April 9, 2013 || Haleakala || Pan-STARRS ||  || align=right | 1.9 km || 
|-id=639 bgcolor=#fefefe
| 601639 ||  || — || April 12, 2013 || Siding Spring || SSS ||  || align=right data-sort-value="0.55" | 550 m || 
|-id=640 bgcolor=#d6d6d6
| 601640 ||  || — || April 9, 2013 || Haleakala || Pan-STARRS ||  || align=right | 1.6 km || 
|-id=641 bgcolor=#fefefe
| 601641 ||  || — || April 9, 2013 || Haleakala || Pan-STARRS ||  || align=right data-sort-value="0.63" | 630 m || 
|-id=642 bgcolor=#d6d6d6
| 601642 ||  || — || December 29, 2011 || Mount Lemmon || Mount Lemmon Survey ||  || align=right | 1.9 km || 
|-id=643 bgcolor=#d6d6d6
| 601643 ||  || — || April 9, 2013 || Haleakala || Pan-STARRS ||  || align=right | 2.2 km || 
|-id=644 bgcolor=#E9E9E9
| 601644 ||  || — || August 5, 2005 || Siding Spring || SSS ||  || align=right | 1.2 km || 
|-id=645 bgcolor=#d6d6d6
| 601645 ||  || — || April 19, 2013 || Haleakala || Pan-STARRS ||  || align=right | 2.1 km || 
|-id=646 bgcolor=#d6d6d6
| 601646 ||  || — || April 19, 2013 || Haleakala || Pan-STARRS ||  || align=right | 2.5 km || 
|-id=647 bgcolor=#d6d6d6
| 601647 ||  || — || November 3, 2016 || Haleakala || Pan-STARRS ||  || align=right | 2.2 km || 
|-id=648 bgcolor=#fefefe
| 601648 ||  || — || April 17, 2013 || Haleakala || Pan-STARRS ||  || align=right data-sort-value="0.44" | 440 m || 
|-id=649 bgcolor=#fefefe
| 601649 ||  || — || January 18, 2009 || Kitt Peak || Spacewatch ||  || align=right data-sort-value="0.54" | 540 m || 
|-id=650 bgcolor=#fefefe
| 601650 ||  || — || April 21, 2013 || Mount Lemmon || Mount Lemmon Survey ||  || align=right data-sort-value="0.51" | 510 m || 
|-id=651 bgcolor=#d6d6d6
| 601651 ||  || — || April 16, 2013 || Haleakala || Pan-STARRS ||  || align=right | 2.5 km || 
|-id=652 bgcolor=#E9E9E9
| 601652 ||  || — || April 19, 2013 || Haleakala || Pan-STARRS ||  || align=right | 1.1 km || 
|-id=653 bgcolor=#d6d6d6
| 601653 ||  || — || April 10, 2013 || XuYi || PMO NEO || Tj (2.99) || align=right | 2.4 km || 
|-id=654 bgcolor=#FA8072
| 601654 ||  || — || April 13, 2013 || Haleakala || Pan-STARRS ||  || align=right data-sort-value="0.63" | 630 m || 
|-id=655 bgcolor=#fefefe
| 601655 ||  || — || April 13, 2008 || Kitt Peak || Spacewatch || H || align=right data-sort-value="0.61" | 610 m || 
|-id=656 bgcolor=#d6d6d6
| 601656 ||  || — || October 15, 2004 || Mount Lemmon || Mount Lemmon Survey ||  || align=right | 3.1 km || 
|-id=657 bgcolor=#d6d6d6
| 601657 ||  || — || November 10, 2010 || Mount Lemmon || Mount Lemmon Survey ||  || align=right | 3.2 km || 
|-id=658 bgcolor=#fefefe
| 601658 ||  || — || May 7, 2013 || Mount Lemmon || Mount Lemmon Survey ||  || align=right data-sort-value="0.57" | 570 m || 
|-id=659 bgcolor=#d6d6d6
| 601659 ||  || — || January 7, 2006 || Kitt Peak || Spacewatch ||  || align=right | 3.5 km || 
|-id=660 bgcolor=#E9E9E9
| 601660 ||  || — || May 2, 2013 || Mount Lemmon || Mount Lemmon Survey ||  || align=right | 2.2 km || 
|-id=661 bgcolor=#FA8072
| 601661 ||  || — || May 13, 1996 || Kitt Peak || Spacewatch ||  || align=right data-sort-value="0.90" | 900 m || 
|-id=662 bgcolor=#d6d6d6
| 601662 ||  || — || September 7, 2004 || Socorro || LINEAR ||  || align=right | 3.4 km || 
|-id=663 bgcolor=#d6d6d6
| 601663 ||  || — || December 29, 2011 || Mount Lemmon || Mount Lemmon Survey ||  || align=right | 2.5 km || 
|-id=664 bgcolor=#E9E9E9
| 601664 ||  || — || May 12, 2013 || Haleakala || Pan-STARRS ||  || align=right | 1.4 km || 
|-id=665 bgcolor=#d6d6d6
| 601665 ||  || — || March 14, 2007 || Anderson Mesa || LONEOS ||  || align=right | 2.6 km || 
|-id=666 bgcolor=#fefefe
| 601666 ||  || — || May 11, 2013 || Mount Lemmon || Mount Lemmon Survey ||  || align=right data-sort-value="0.50" | 500 m || 
|-id=667 bgcolor=#d6d6d6
| 601667 ||  || — || October 18, 2009 || Mount Lemmon || Mount Lemmon Survey ||  || align=right | 3.0 km || 
|-id=668 bgcolor=#d6d6d6
| 601668 ||  || — || May 12, 2013 || Haleakala || Pan-STARRS ||  || align=right | 2.6 km || 
|-id=669 bgcolor=#fefefe
| 601669 ||  || — || May 1, 2013 || Kitt Peak || Spacewatch ||  || align=right data-sort-value="0.84" | 840 m || 
|-id=670 bgcolor=#d6d6d6
| 601670 ||  || — || May 1, 2013 || Mount Lemmon || Mount Lemmon Survey ||  || align=right | 2.2 km || 
|-id=671 bgcolor=#fefefe
| 601671 ||  || — || April 15, 2013 || Haleakala || Pan-STARRS ||  || align=right data-sort-value="0.81" | 810 m || 
|-id=672 bgcolor=#d6d6d6
| 601672 ||  || — || December 2, 2005 || Mount Lemmon || Mount Lemmon Survey ||  || align=right | 2.1 km || 
|-id=673 bgcolor=#fefefe
| 601673 ||  || — || April 15, 2013 || Haleakala || Pan-STARRS ||  || align=right data-sort-value="0.58" | 580 m || 
|-id=674 bgcolor=#fefefe
| 601674 ||  || — || April 11, 2013 || Mount Lemmon || Mount Lemmon Survey ||  || align=right data-sort-value="0.76" | 760 m || 
|-id=675 bgcolor=#fefefe
| 601675 ||  || — || February 5, 2016 || Haleakala || Pan-STARRS ||  || align=right data-sort-value="0.59" | 590 m || 
|-id=676 bgcolor=#fefefe
| 601676 ||  || — || August 22, 2014 || Haleakala || Pan-STARRS ||  || align=right data-sort-value="0.62" | 620 m || 
|-id=677 bgcolor=#fefefe
| 601677 ||  || — || May 13, 2013 || Kitt Peak || Spacewatch ||  || align=right data-sort-value="0.71" | 710 m || 
|-id=678 bgcolor=#fefefe
| 601678 ||  || — || May 8, 2013 || Haleakala || Pan-STARRS ||  || align=right data-sort-value="0.60" | 600 m || 
|-id=679 bgcolor=#fefefe
| 601679 ||  || — || May 1, 2013 || Mount Lemmon || Mount Lemmon Survey ||  || align=right data-sort-value="0.43" | 430 m || 
|-id=680 bgcolor=#d6d6d6
| 601680 ||  || — || May 11, 2013 || Mount Lemmon || Mount Lemmon Survey ||  || align=right | 2.5 km || 
|-id=681 bgcolor=#d6d6d6
| 601681 ||  || — || May 5, 2013 || Mount Lemmon || Mount Lemmon Survey ||  || align=right | 2.6 km || 
|-id=682 bgcolor=#d6d6d6
| 601682 ||  || — || May 1, 2013 || Mount Lemmon || Mount Lemmon Survey ||  || align=right | 2.1 km || 
|-id=683 bgcolor=#fefefe
| 601683 ||  || — || March 11, 2005 || Kitt Peak || Spacewatch ||  || align=right data-sort-value="0.64" | 640 m || 
|-id=684 bgcolor=#fefefe
| 601684 ||  || — || November 16, 2006 || Kitt Peak || Spacewatch || V || align=right data-sort-value="0.82" | 820 m || 
|-id=685 bgcolor=#d6d6d6
| 601685 ||  || — || May 3, 2013 || Mount Lemmon || Mount Lemmon Survey ||  || align=right | 3.2 km || 
|-id=686 bgcolor=#d6d6d6
| 601686 ||  || — || June 5, 2002 || Socorro || LINEAR || Tj (2.89) || align=right | 2.8 km || 
|-id=687 bgcolor=#fefefe
| 601687 ||  || — || September 11, 2010 || Kitt Peak || Spacewatch ||  || align=right data-sort-value="0.60" | 600 m || 
|-id=688 bgcolor=#d6d6d6
| 601688 ||  || — || May 19, 2013 || Charleston || R. Holmes ||  || align=right | 3.0 km || 
|-id=689 bgcolor=#fefefe
| 601689 ||  || — || May 11, 2013 || Siding Spring || SSS ||  || align=right data-sort-value="0.76" | 760 m || 
|-id=690 bgcolor=#C2E0FF
| 601690 ||  || — || May 16, 2013 || Haleakala || Pan-STARRS || centaur || align=right | 74 km || 
|-id=691 bgcolor=#fefefe
| 601691 ||  || — || June 4, 2013 || Mount Lemmon || Mount Lemmon Survey ||  || align=right data-sort-value="0.55" | 550 m || 
|-id=692 bgcolor=#fefefe
| 601692 ||  || — || June 5, 2013 || Mount Lemmon || Mount Lemmon Survey ||  || align=right data-sort-value="0.71" | 710 m || 
|-id=693 bgcolor=#fefefe
| 601693 ||  || — || May 16, 2013 || Haleakala || Pan-STARRS ||  || align=right data-sort-value="0.63" | 630 m || 
|-id=694 bgcolor=#d6d6d6
| 601694 ||  || — || June 2, 2013 || Bergisch Gladbach || W. Bickel || EOS || align=right | 2.0 km || 
|-id=695 bgcolor=#d6d6d6
| 601695 ||  || — || June 8, 2013 || Kitt Peak || Spacewatch ||  || align=right | 2.5 km || 
|-id=696 bgcolor=#FFC2E0
| 601696 ||  || — || June 10, 2013 || Mount Lemmon || Mount Lemmon Survey || APO || align=right data-sort-value="0.63" | 630 m || 
|-id=697 bgcolor=#fefefe
| 601697 ||  || — || June 10, 2013 || Mount Lemmon || Mount Lemmon Survey ||  || align=right data-sort-value="0.65" | 650 m || 
|-id=698 bgcolor=#d6d6d6
| 601698 ||  || — || June 7, 2013 || Haleakala || Pan-STARRS ||  || align=right | 2.4 km || 
|-id=699 bgcolor=#d6d6d6
| 601699 ||  || — || September 6, 2002 || Socorro || LINEAR ||  || align=right | 2.9 km || 
|-id=700 bgcolor=#FA8072
| 601700 ||  || — || June 18, 2013 || Haleakala || Pan-STARRS ||  || align=right data-sort-value="0.53" | 530 m || 
|}

601701–601800 

|-bgcolor=#fefefe
| 601701 ||  || — || June 20, 2013 || Haleakala || Pan-STARRS ||  || align=right data-sort-value="0.50" | 500 m || 
|-id=702 bgcolor=#d6d6d6
| 601702 ||  || — || January 3, 2017 || Haleakala || Pan-STARRS ||  || align=right | 3.0 km || 
|-id=703 bgcolor=#d6d6d6
| 601703 ||  || — || July 1, 2013 || Haleakala || Pan-STARRS ||  || align=right | 2.7 km || 
|-id=704 bgcolor=#fefefe
| 601704 ||  || — || May 23, 2006 || Mount Lemmon || Mount Lemmon Survey ||  || align=right data-sort-value="0.70" | 700 m || 
|-id=705 bgcolor=#fefefe
| 601705 ||  || — || September 28, 2006 || Bergisch Gladbach || W. Bickel ||  || align=right data-sort-value="0.73" | 730 m || 
|-id=706 bgcolor=#fefefe
| 601706 ||  || — || August 6, 2002 || Palomar || NEAT ||  || align=right data-sort-value="0.83" | 830 m || 
|-id=707 bgcolor=#fefefe
| 601707 ||  || — || October 10, 2007 || Catalina || CSS ||  || align=right data-sort-value="0.78" | 780 m || 
|-id=708 bgcolor=#fefefe
| 601708 ||  || — || February 19, 2009 || Kitt Peak || Spacewatch ||  || align=right data-sort-value="0.57" | 570 m || 
|-id=709 bgcolor=#d6d6d6
| 601709 ||  || — || September 9, 2008 || Mount Lemmon || Mount Lemmon Survey ||  || align=right | 1.5 km || 
|-id=710 bgcolor=#fefefe
| 601710 ||  || — || July 1, 2013 || Haleakala || Pan-STARRS ||  || align=right data-sort-value="0.61" | 610 m || 
|-id=711 bgcolor=#fefefe
| 601711 ||  || — || July 6, 2013 || Haleakala || Pan-STARRS ||  || align=right data-sort-value="0.65" | 650 m || 
|-id=712 bgcolor=#fefefe
| 601712 ||  || — || July 14, 2013 || Haleakala || Pan-STARRS ||  || align=right data-sort-value="0.48" | 480 m || 
|-id=713 bgcolor=#fefefe
| 601713 ||  || — || July 15, 2013 || Haleakala || Pan-STARRS ||  || align=right data-sort-value="0.75" | 750 m || 
|-id=714 bgcolor=#d6d6d6
| 601714 ||  || — || November 20, 2015 || Mount Lemmon || Mount Lemmon Survey ||  || align=right | 3.5 km || 
|-id=715 bgcolor=#d6d6d6
| 601715 ||  || — || July 1, 2013 || Haleakala || Pan-STARRS ||  || align=right | 2.7 km || 
|-id=716 bgcolor=#d6d6d6
| 601716 ||  || — || August 3, 2014 || Haleakala || Pan-STARRS ||  || align=right | 2.9 km || 
|-id=717 bgcolor=#fefefe
| 601717 ||  || — || July 14, 2013 || Haleakala || Pan-STARRS ||  || align=right data-sort-value="0.72" | 720 m || 
|-id=718 bgcolor=#fefefe
| 601718 ||  || — || July 14, 2013 || Haleakala || Pan-STARRS ||  || align=right data-sort-value="0.58" | 580 m || 
|-id=719 bgcolor=#fefefe
| 601719 ||  || — || February 9, 2005 || Mount Lemmon || Mount Lemmon Survey ||  || align=right data-sort-value="0.63" | 630 m || 
|-id=720 bgcolor=#fefefe
| 601720 ||  || — || July 13, 2013 || Haleakala || Pan-STARRS ||  || align=right data-sort-value="0.54" | 540 m || 
|-id=721 bgcolor=#fefefe
| 601721 ||  || — || July 14, 2013 || Haleakala || Pan-STARRS ||  || align=right data-sort-value="0.56" | 560 m || 
|-id=722 bgcolor=#d6d6d6
| 601722 ||  || — || July 13, 2013 || Haleakala || Pan-STARRS ||  || align=right | 1.9 km || 
|-id=723 bgcolor=#E9E9E9
| 601723 ||  || — || December 5, 2010 || Mount Lemmon || Mount Lemmon Survey ||  || align=right | 1.3 km || 
|-id=724 bgcolor=#fefefe
| 601724 ||  || — || October 8, 2002 || Palomar || NEAT ||  || align=right | 1.1 km || 
|-id=725 bgcolor=#fefefe
| 601725 ||  || — || July 30, 2013 || Kitt Peak || Spacewatch ||  || align=right data-sort-value="0.86" | 860 m || 
|-id=726 bgcolor=#fefefe
| 601726 ||  || — || June 18, 2013 || Mount Lemmon || Mount Lemmon Survey ||  || align=right data-sort-value="0.92" | 920 m || 
|-id=727 bgcolor=#d6d6d6
| 601727 ||  || — || June 20, 2013 || Haleakala || Pan-STARRS || Tj (2.88) || align=right | 3.2 km || 
|-id=728 bgcolor=#fefefe
| 601728 ||  || — || August 2, 2013 || Haleakala || Pan-STARRS || H || align=right data-sort-value="0.62" | 620 m || 
|-id=729 bgcolor=#d6d6d6
| 601729 ||  || — || February 25, 2011 || Mount Lemmon || Mount Lemmon Survey ||  || align=right | 2.2 km || 
|-id=730 bgcolor=#fefefe
| 601730 ||  || — || January 13, 2008 || Kitt Peak || Spacewatch ||  || align=right data-sort-value="0.86" | 860 m || 
|-id=731 bgcolor=#E9E9E9
| 601731 Kukuczka ||  ||  || August 3, 2013 || Tincana || M. Żołnowski, M. Kusiak || JUN || align=right | 1.3 km || 
|-id=732 bgcolor=#E9E9E9
| 601732 ||  || — || July 11, 2004 || Socorro || LINEAR ||  || align=right | 1.5 km || 
|-id=733 bgcolor=#d6d6d6
| 601733 ||  || — || August 1, 2013 || Haleakala || Pan-STARRS ||  || align=right | 3.3 km || 
|-id=734 bgcolor=#d6d6d6
| 601734 ||  || — || October 2, 2008 || Kitt Peak || Spacewatch ||  || align=right | 2.2 km || 
|-id=735 bgcolor=#fefefe
| 601735 ||  || — || August 9, 2013 || Kitt Peak || Spacewatch ||  || align=right data-sort-value="0.68" | 680 m || 
|-id=736 bgcolor=#fefefe
| 601736 ||  || — || August 8, 2013 || Kitt Peak || Spacewatch ||  || align=right data-sort-value="0.68" | 680 m || 
|-id=737 bgcolor=#E9E9E9
| 601737 ||  || — || April 25, 2003 || Apache Point || SDSS Collaboration || HNS || align=right | 1.2 km || 
|-id=738 bgcolor=#fefefe
| 601738 ||  || — || August 10, 2013 || Palomar || PTF ||  || align=right data-sort-value="0.72" | 720 m || 
|-id=739 bgcolor=#fefefe
| 601739 ||  || — || April 30, 2006 || Kitt Peak || Spacewatch ||  || align=right data-sort-value="0.68" | 680 m || 
|-id=740 bgcolor=#fefefe
| 601740 ||  || — || December 15, 2010 || Mount Lemmon || Mount Lemmon Survey ||  || align=right data-sort-value="0.64" | 640 m || 
|-id=741 bgcolor=#fefefe
| 601741 ||  || — || September 30, 2003 || Kitt Peak || Spacewatch ||  || align=right data-sort-value="0.41" | 410 m || 
|-id=742 bgcolor=#fefefe
| 601742 ||  || — || March 13, 2012 || Mount Lemmon || Mount Lemmon Survey ||  || align=right data-sort-value="0.62" | 620 m || 
|-id=743 bgcolor=#d6d6d6
| 601743 ||  || — || July 16, 2013 || Haleakala || Pan-STARRS ||  || align=right | 1.9 km || 
|-id=744 bgcolor=#d6d6d6
| 601744 ||  || — || May 16, 2012 || Haleakala || Pan-STARRS || 7:4 || align=right | 3.1 km || 
|-id=745 bgcolor=#fefefe
| 601745 ||  || — || August 2, 2013 || Haleakala || Pan-STARRS ||  || align=right | 1.1 km || 
|-id=746 bgcolor=#fefefe
| 601746 ||  || — || August 6, 2013 || ESA OGS || ESA OGS ||  || align=right data-sort-value="0.61" | 610 m || 
|-id=747 bgcolor=#d6d6d6
| 601747 ||  || — || November 3, 2008 || Mount Lemmon || Mount Lemmon Survey ||  || align=right | 3.1 km || 
|-id=748 bgcolor=#fefefe
| 601748 ||  || — || August 12, 2013 || Haleakala || Pan-STARRS ||  || align=right data-sort-value="0.57" | 570 m || 
|-id=749 bgcolor=#fefefe
| 601749 ||  || — || August 8, 2013 || Haleakala || Pan-STARRS ||  || align=right data-sort-value="0.62" | 620 m || 
|-id=750 bgcolor=#fefefe
| 601750 ||  || — || August 15, 2013 || Haleakala || Pan-STARRS ||  || align=right data-sort-value="0.77" | 770 m || 
|-id=751 bgcolor=#fefefe
| 601751 ||  || — || August 14, 2013 || Haleakala || Pan-STARRS ||  || align=right data-sort-value="0.45" | 450 m || 
|-id=752 bgcolor=#fefefe
| 601752 ||  || — || August 4, 2013 || Haleakala || Pan-STARRS || H || align=right data-sort-value="0.53" | 530 m || 
|-id=753 bgcolor=#fefefe
| 601753 ||  || — || August 14, 2013 || Haleakala || Pan-STARRS ||  || align=right data-sort-value="0.49" | 490 m || 
|-id=754 bgcolor=#E9E9E9
| 601754 ||  || — || August 25, 2004 || Kitt Peak || Spacewatch ||  || align=right | 1.3 km || 
|-id=755 bgcolor=#d6d6d6
| 601755 ||  || — || August 14, 2013 || Haleakala || Pan-STARRS ||  || align=right | 2.1 km || 
|-id=756 bgcolor=#E9E9E9
| 601756 ||  || — || August 9, 2013 || Haleakala || Pan-STARRS ||  || align=right data-sort-value="0.80" | 800 m || 
|-id=757 bgcolor=#fefefe
| 601757 ||  || — || October 4, 2002 || Palomar || NEAT ||  || align=right data-sort-value="0.62" | 620 m || 
|-id=758 bgcolor=#fefefe
| 601758 ||  || — || September 21, 2003 || Kitt Peak || Spacewatch || H || align=right data-sort-value="0.64" | 640 m || 
|-id=759 bgcolor=#fefefe
| 601759 ||  || — || August 12, 2013 || Kitt Peak || Spacewatch ||  || align=right data-sort-value="0.61" | 610 m || 
|-id=760 bgcolor=#fefefe
| 601760 ||  || — || November 27, 2010 || Mount Lemmon || Mount Lemmon Survey ||  || align=right data-sort-value="0.64" | 640 m || 
|-id=761 bgcolor=#fefefe
| 601761 ||  || — || March 10, 2005 || Mount Lemmon || Mount Lemmon Survey ||  || align=right data-sort-value="0.69" | 690 m || 
|-id=762 bgcolor=#fefefe
| 601762 ||  || — || May 7, 2006 || Kitt Peak || Spacewatch ||  || align=right data-sort-value="0.54" | 540 m || 
|-id=763 bgcolor=#fefefe
| 601763 ||  || — || August 14, 2013 || Haleakala || Pan-STARRS ||  || align=right data-sort-value="0.75" | 750 m || 
|-id=764 bgcolor=#fefefe
| 601764 ||  || — || August 8, 2013 || Kitt Peak || Spacewatch ||  || align=right data-sort-value="0.66" | 660 m || 
|-id=765 bgcolor=#fefefe
| 601765 ||  || — || August 24, 2006 || Palomar || NEAT ||  || align=right data-sort-value="0.56" | 560 m || 
|-id=766 bgcolor=#fefefe
| 601766 ||  || — || August 14, 2013 || Haleakala || Pan-STARRS ||  || align=right data-sort-value="0.58" | 580 m || 
|-id=767 bgcolor=#fefefe
| 601767 ||  || — || January 17, 2004 || Palomar || NEAT || PHO || align=right data-sort-value="0.64" | 640 m || 
|-id=768 bgcolor=#fefefe
| 601768 ||  || — || August 9, 2013 || Haleakala || Pan-STARRS ||  || align=right data-sort-value="0.56" | 560 m || 
|-id=769 bgcolor=#fefefe
| 601769 ||  || — || August 30, 2013 || Haleakala || Pan-STARRS || H || align=right data-sort-value="0.70" | 700 m || 
|-id=770 bgcolor=#fefefe
| 601770 ||  || — || September 20, 1998 || Kitt Peak || Spacewatch || SUL || align=right | 2.0 km || 
|-id=771 bgcolor=#fefefe
| 601771 ||  || — || June 19, 2013 || Mount Lemmon || Mount Lemmon Survey || NYS || align=right data-sort-value="0.69" | 690 m || 
|-id=772 bgcolor=#fefefe
| 601772 ||  || — || October 2, 2006 || Mount Lemmon || Mount Lemmon Survey ||  || align=right data-sort-value="0.53" | 530 m || 
|-id=773 bgcolor=#E9E9E9
| 601773 ||  || — || August 9, 2013 || Kitt Peak || Spacewatch ||  || align=right | 1.8 km || 
|-id=774 bgcolor=#fefefe
| 601774 ||  || — || September 16, 2006 || Palomar || NEAT || NYS || align=right data-sort-value="0.80" | 800 m || 
|-id=775 bgcolor=#fefefe
| 601775 ||  || — || September 17, 2010 || Mount Lemmon || Mount Lemmon Survey ||  || align=right data-sort-value="0.64" | 640 m || 
|-id=776 bgcolor=#fefefe
| 601776 ||  || — || August 27, 2005 || Palomar || NEAT || H || align=right data-sort-value="0.45" | 450 m || 
|-id=777 bgcolor=#fefefe
| 601777 ||  || — || August 8, 2013 || Kitt Peak || Spacewatch ||  || align=right data-sort-value="0.56" | 560 m || 
|-id=778 bgcolor=#fefefe
| 601778 ||  || — || August 28, 2013 || Mount Lemmon || Mount Lemmon Survey ||  || align=right data-sort-value="0.51" | 510 m || 
|-id=779 bgcolor=#d6d6d6
| 601779 ||  || — || August 28, 2013 || Haleakala || Pan-STARRS ||  || align=right | 2.0 km || 
|-id=780 bgcolor=#fefefe
| 601780 ||  || — || December 2, 2010 || Mount Lemmon || Mount Lemmon Survey || V || align=right data-sort-value="0.48" | 480 m || 
|-id=781 bgcolor=#fefefe
| 601781 ||  || — || February 27, 2012 || Haleakala || Pan-STARRS ||  || align=right data-sort-value="0.67" | 670 m || 
|-id=782 bgcolor=#fefefe
| 601782 ||  || — || August 27, 2005 || Palomar || NEAT ||  || align=right | 1.2 km || 
|-id=783 bgcolor=#fefefe
| 601783 ||  || — || September 4, 2013 || Haleakala || Pan-STARRS || H || align=right data-sort-value="0.73" | 730 m || 
|-id=784 bgcolor=#fefefe
| 601784 ||  || — || July 28, 2005 || Palomar || NEAT ||  || align=right data-sort-value="0.79" | 790 m || 
|-id=785 bgcolor=#fefefe
| 601785 ||  || — || September 5, 2013 || Kitt Peak || Spacewatch ||  || align=right data-sort-value="0.71" | 710 m || 
|-id=786 bgcolor=#E9E9E9
| 601786 ||  || — || August 13, 2013 || Crni Vrh || S. Matičič ||  || align=right | 1.5 km || 
|-id=787 bgcolor=#fefefe
| 601787 ||  || — || January 17, 2005 || Kitt Peak || Spacewatch ||  || align=right data-sort-value="0.63" | 630 m || 
|-id=788 bgcolor=#fefefe
| 601788 ||  || — || December 9, 2010 || Kitt Peak || Spacewatch ||  || align=right data-sort-value="0.80" | 800 m || 
|-id=789 bgcolor=#fefefe
| 601789 ||  || — || September 1, 2013 || Haleakala || Pan-STARRS ||  || align=right data-sort-value="0.57" | 570 m || 
|-id=790 bgcolor=#E9E9E9
| 601790 ||  || — || December 25, 2005 || Mount Lemmon || Mount Lemmon Survey ||  || align=right | 2.5 km || 
|-id=791 bgcolor=#fefefe
| 601791 ||  || — || August 29, 2006 || Wrightwood || J. W. Young ||  || align=right data-sort-value="0.77" | 770 m || 
|-id=792 bgcolor=#fefefe
| 601792 ||  || — || February 28, 2008 || Mount Lemmon || Mount Lemmon Survey ||  || align=right data-sort-value="0.68" | 680 m || 
|-id=793 bgcolor=#fefefe
| 601793 ||  || — || September 16, 2003 || Kitt Peak || Spacewatch ||  || align=right data-sort-value="0.72" | 720 m || 
|-id=794 bgcolor=#E9E9E9
| 601794 ||  || — || September 6, 2004 || Palomar || NEAT || EUN || align=right | 1.3 km || 
|-id=795 bgcolor=#E9E9E9
| 601795 ||  || — || April 30, 2011 || Mount Lemmon || Mount Lemmon Survey ||  || align=right | 1.3 km || 
|-id=796 bgcolor=#fefefe
| 601796 ||  || — || May 19, 2005 || Mount Lemmon || Mount Lemmon Survey || NYS || align=right data-sort-value="0.70" | 700 m || 
|-id=797 bgcolor=#d6d6d6
| 601797 ||  || — || September 4, 2013 || Catalina || CSS || Tj (2.91) || align=right | 2.3 km || 
|-id=798 bgcolor=#FFC2E0
| 601798 ||  || — || September 15, 2013 || La Sagra || OAM Obs. || APO +1km || align=right data-sort-value="0.81" | 810 m || 
|-id=799 bgcolor=#fefefe
| 601799 ||  || — || September 26, 2006 || Kitt Peak || Spacewatch ||  || align=right data-sort-value="0.85" | 850 m || 
|-id=800 bgcolor=#E9E9E9
| 601800 ||  || — || October 1, 2013 || Catalina || CSS ||  || align=right | 1.5 km || 
|}

601801–601900 

|-bgcolor=#d6d6d6
| 601801 ||  || — || October 20, 2008 || Kitt Peak || Spacewatch ||  || align=right | 2.4 km || 
|-id=802 bgcolor=#fefefe
| 601802 ||  || — || February 28, 2012 || Haleakala || Pan-STARRS ||  || align=right data-sort-value="0.56" | 560 m || 
|-id=803 bgcolor=#fefefe
| 601803 ||  || — || September 13, 2005 || Kitt Peak || Spacewatch ||  || align=right data-sort-value="0.60" | 600 m || 
|-id=804 bgcolor=#fefefe
| 601804 ||  || — || September 1, 2013 || Mount Lemmon || Mount Lemmon Survey ||  || align=right data-sort-value="0.58" | 580 m || 
|-id=805 bgcolor=#d6d6d6
| 601805 ||  || — || September 14, 2013 || Haleakala || Pan-STARRS ||  || align=right | 2.8 km || 
|-id=806 bgcolor=#fefefe
| 601806 ||  || — || September 1, 2013 || Mount Lemmon || Mount Lemmon Survey ||  || align=right data-sort-value="0.53" | 530 m || 
|-id=807 bgcolor=#E9E9E9
| 601807 ||  || — || September 15, 2013 || Kitt Peak || Spacewatch ||  || align=right data-sort-value="0.71" | 710 m || 
|-id=808 bgcolor=#fefefe
| 601808 ||  || — || September 9, 2013 || Haleakala || Pan-STARRS ||  || align=right data-sort-value="0.64" | 640 m || 
|-id=809 bgcolor=#d6d6d6
| 601809 ||  || — || September 14, 2013 || Haleakala || Pan-STARRS ||  || align=right | 2.2 km || 
|-id=810 bgcolor=#E9E9E9
| 601810 ||  || — || September 9, 2013 || Haleakala || Pan-STARRS ||  || align=right | 1.2 km || 
|-id=811 bgcolor=#E9E9E9
| 601811 ||  || — || September 17, 2013 || Mount Lemmon || Mount Lemmon Survey ||  || align=right | 2.0 km || 
|-id=812 bgcolor=#fefefe
| 601812 ||  || — || January 25, 2004 || Sierra Nevada || Sierra Nevada Obs. || H || align=right data-sort-value="0.89" | 890 m || 
|-id=813 bgcolor=#fefefe
| 601813 ||  || — || February 13, 2008 || Kitt Peak || Spacewatch ||  || align=right data-sort-value="0.60" | 600 m || 
|-id=814 bgcolor=#fefefe
| 601814 ||  || — || May 19, 2012 || Mount Lemmon || Mount Lemmon Survey ||  || align=right | 1.0 km || 
|-id=815 bgcolor=#fefefe
| 601815 ||  || — || September 28, 2013 || Catalina || CSS ||  || align=right data-sort-value="0.81" | 810 m || 
|-id=816 bgcolor=#d6d6d6
| 601816 ||  || — || March 23, 2006 || Kitt Peak || Spacewatch ||  || align=right | 2.5 km || 
|-id=817 bgcolor=#fefefe
| 601817 ||  || — || April 22, 2009 || Mount Lemmon || Mount Lemmon Survey ||  || align=right data-sort-value="0.54" | 540 m || 
|-id=818 bgcolor=#fefefe
| 601818 ||  || — || December 13, 2010 || Mauna Kea || L. Wells, M. Micheli ||  || align=right data-sort-value="0.78" | 780 m || 
|-id=819 bgcolor=#fefefe
| 601819 ||  || — || May 3, 2002 || Palomar || NEAT || H || align=right data-sort-value="0.90" | 900 m || 
|-id=820 bgcolor=#fefefe
| 601820 ||  || — || January 30, 2008 || Mount Lemmon || Mount Lemmon Survey ||  || align=right data-sort-value="0.90" | 900 m || 
|-id=821 bgcolor=#E9E9E9
| 601821 ||  || — || October 24, 2009 || Kitt Peak || Spacewatch ||  || align=right | 1.6 km || 
|-id=822 bgcolor=#d6d6d6
| 601822 ||  || — || October 1, 2013 || Elena Remote || A. Oreshko ||  || align=right | 2.8 km || 
|-id=823 bgcolor=#fefefe
| 601823 ||  || — || October 2, 2013 || Kitt Peak || Spacewatch ||  || align=right data-sort-value="0.57" | 570 m || 
|-id=824 bgcolor=#FA8072
| 601824 ||  || — || October 13, 2010 || Mount Lemmon || Mount Lemmon Survey ||  || align=right data-sort-value="0.67" | 670 m || 
|-id=825 bgcolor=#C2FFFF
| 601825 ||  || — || October 2, 2013 || Palomar || PTF || L5 || align=right | 9.0 km || 
|-id=826 bgcolor=#fefefe
| 601826 ||  || — || January 17, 2007 || Kitt Peak || Spacewatch ||  || align=right data-sort-value="0.63" | 630 m || 
|-id=827 bgcolor=#E9E9E9
| 601827 ||  || — || September 4, 2013 || Mount Lemmon || Mount Lemmon Survey ||  || align=right | 1.5 km || 
|-id=828 bgcolor=#E9E9E9
| 601828 ||  || — || March 12, 2007 || Kitt Peak || Spacewatch ||  || align=right | 1.0 km || 
|-id=829 bgcolor=#d6d6d6
| 601829 ||  || — || October 7, 2005 || Kitt Peak || Spacewatch || 3:2 || align=right | 3.0 km || 
|-id=830 bgcolor=#fefefe
| 601830 ||  || — || February 7, 2011 || Mount Lemmon || Mount Lemmon Survey || CLA || align=right | 1.1 km || 
|-id=831 bgcolor=#d6d6d6
| 601831 ||  || — || March 25, 2006 || Kitt Peak || Spacewatch ||  || align=right | 2.6 km || 
|-id=832 bgcolor=#fefefe
| 601832 ||  || — || July 28, 2005 || Palomar || NEAT ||  || align=right data-sort-value="0.97" | 970 m || 
|-id=833 bgcolor=#fefefe
| 601833 ||  || — || October 27, 2006 || Catalina || CSS ||  || align=right data-sort-value="0.53" | 530 m || 
|-id=834 bgcolor=#fefefe
| 601834 ||  || — || October 2, 2013 || Kitt Peak || Spacewatch ||  || align=right data-sort-value="0.83" | 830 m || 
|-id=835 bgcolor=#E9E9E9
| 601835 ||  || — || August 6, 2008 || Siding Spring || SSS ||  || align=right | 2.4 km || 
|-id=836 bgcolor=#fefefe
| 601836 ||  || — || May 16, 2002 || Palomar || NEAT || V || align=right data-sort-value="0.86" | 860 m || 
|-id=837 bgcolor=#E9E9E9
| 601837 ||  || — || October 15, 2004 || Kitt Peak || Spacewatch ||  || align=right | 1.8 km || 
|-id=838 bgcolor=#fefefe
| 601838 ||  || — || September 6, 2013 || Kitt Peak || Spacewatch ||  || align=right data-sort-value="0.56" | 560 m || 
|-id=839 bgcolor=#fefefe
| 601839 ||  || — || May 14, 2008 || Kitt Peak || Spacewatch ||  || align=right data-sort-value="0.78" | 780 m || 
|-id=840 bgcolor=#fefefe
| 601840 ||  || — || September 26, 2006 || Mount Lemmon || Mount Lemmon Survey ||  || align=right data-sort-value="0.58" | 580 m || 
|-id=841 bgcolor=#fefefe
| 601841 ||  || — || September 25, 2006 || Mount Lemmon || Mount Lemmon Survey ||  || align=right data-sort-value="0.48" | 480 m || 
|-id=842 bgcolor=#fefefe
| 601842 ||  || — || April 10, 2000 || Kitt Peak || Kitt Peak Obs. ||  || align=right data-sort-value="0.79" | 790 m || 
|-id=843 bgcolor=#fefefe
| 601843 ||  || — || August 14, 2006 || Siding Spring || SSS ||  || align=right data-sort-value="0.53" | 530 m || 
|-id=844 bgcolor=#fefefe
| 601844 ||  || — || April 27, 2012 || Haleakala || Pan-STARRS ||  || align=right data-sort-value="0.82" | 820 m || 
|-id=845 bgcolor=#E9E9E9
| 601845 ||  || — || October 3, 2013 || Haleakala || Pan-STARRS ||  || align=right | 2.0 km || 
|-id=846 bgcolor=#fefefe
| 601846 ||  || — || August 30, 2009 || Kitt Peak || Spacewatch ||  || align=right data-sort-value="0.65" | 650 m || 
|-id=847 bgcolor=#fefefe
| 601847 ||  || — || August 21, 2006 || Kitt Peak || Spacewatch ||  || align=right data-sort-value="0.55" | 550 m || 
|-id=848 bgcolor=#fefefe
| 601848 ||  || — || March 4, 2012 || Catalina || CSS || H || align=right data-sort-value="0.60" | 600 m || 
|-id=849 bgcolor=#d6d6d6
| 601849 ||  || — || November 19, 2003 || Kitt Peak || Spacewatch ||  || align=right | 2.0 km || 
|-id=850 bgcolor=#d6d6d6
| 601850 ||  || — || October 14, 2013 || Mount Lemmon || Mount Lemmon Survey ||  || align=right | 2.4 km || 
|-id=851 bgcolor=#fefefe
| 601851 ||  || — || April 6, 2008 || Mount Lemmon || Mount Lemmon Survey ||  || align=right data-sort-value="0.69" | 690 m || 
|-id=852 bgcolor=#fefefe
| 601852 ||  || — || October 3, 2013 || Mount Lemmon || Mount Lemmon Survey ||  || align=right data-sort-value="0.60" | 600 m || 
|-id=853 bgcolor=#fefefe
| 601853 ||  || — || October 3, 2013 || Mount Lemmon || Mount Lemmon Survey ||  || align=right data-sort-value="0.60" | 600 m || 
|-id=854 bgcolor=#E9E9E9
| 601854 ||  || — || October 5, 2013 || Kitt Peak || Spacewatch ||  || align=right | 1.1 km || 
|-id=855 bgcolor=#E9E9E9
| 601855 ||  || — || October 14, 2013 || Kitt Peak || Spacewatch ||  || align=right | 1.3 km || 
|-id=856 bgcolor=#fefefe
| 601856 ||  || — || October 2, 2013 || Haleakala || Pan-STARRS ||  || align=right data-sort-value="0.69" | 690 m || 
|-id=857 bgcolor=#fefefe
| 601857 ||  || — || October 12, 2013 || Kitt Peak || Spacewatch ||  || align=right data-sort-value="0.54" | 540 m || 
|-id=858 bgcolor=#d6d6d6
| 601858 ||  || — || October 3, 2013 || Haleakala || Pan-STARRS || 3:2 || align=right | 3.5 km || 
|-id=859 bgcolor=#E9E9E9
| 601859 ||  || — || January 17, 2015 || Haleakala || Pan-STARRS ||  || align=right | 1.8 km || 
|-id=860 bgcolor=#fefefe
| 601860 ||  || — || October 3, 2013 || Kitt Peak || Spacewatch ||  || align=right data-sort-value="0.48" | 480 m || 
|-id=861 bgcolor=#C2FFFF
| 601861 ||  || — || October 2, 2013 || Haleakala || Pan-STARRS || L5 || align=right | 7.7 km || 
|-id=862 bgcolor=#C2FFFF
| 601862 ||  || — || October 5, 2013 || Haleakala || Pan-STARRS || L5 || align=right | 6.9 km || 
|-id=863 bgcolor=#fefefe
| 601863 ||  || — || January 22, 2012 || Haleakala || Pan-STARRS || H || align=right data-sort-value="0.58" | 580 m || 
|-id=864 bgcolor=#fefefe
| 601864 ||  || — || December 21, 2008 || Catalina || CSS || H || align=right data-sort-value="0.71" | 710 m || 
|-id=865 bgcolor=#fefefe
| 601865 ||  || — || August 15, 2006 || Palomar || NEAT ||  || align=right data-sort-value="0.60" | 600 m || 
|-id=866 bgcolor=#fefefe
| 601866 ||  || — || September 11, 2005 || Kitt Peak || Spacewatch || H || align=right data-sort-value="0.52" | 520 m || 
|-id=867 bgcolor=#fefefe
| 601867 ||  || — || September 1, 2002 || Emerald Lane || L. Ball ||  || align=right data-sort-value="0.93" | 930 m || 
|-id=868 bgcolor=#fefefe
| 601868 ||  || — || August 5, 2005 || Palomar || NEAT ||  || align=right data-sort-value="0.82" | 820 m || 
|-id=869 bgcolor=#E9E9E9
| 601869 ||  || — || October 26, 2013 || Mount Lemmon || Mount Lemmon Survey ||  || align=right data-sort-value="0.69" | 690 m || 
|-id=870 bgcolor=#d6d6d6
| 601870 ||  || — || October 24, 2013 || Mount Lemmon || Mount Lemmon Survey || 3:2 || align=right | 3.2 km || 
|-id=871 bgcolor=#E9E9E9
| 601871 ||  || — || October 28, 2013 || Mount Lemmon || Mount Lemmon Survey ||  || align=right | 1.7 km || 
|-id=872 bgcolor=#fefefe
| 601872 ||  || — || October 25, 2013 || Kitt Peak || Spacewatch ||  || align=right data-sort-value="0.62" | 620 m || 
|-id=873 bgcolor=#E9E9E9
| 601873 ||  || — || March 16, 2007 || Mount Lemmon || Mount Lemmon Survey ||  || align=right data-sort-value="0.93" | 930 m || 
|-id=874 bgcolor=#E9E9E9
| 601874 ||  || — || October 24, 2013 || Mount Lemmon || Mount Lemmon Survey ||  || align=right | 1.9 km || 
|-id=875 bgcolor=#FA8072
| 601875 ||  || — || July 20, 2013 || Haleakala || Pan-STARRS ||  || align=right data-sort-value="0.69" | 690 m || 
|-id=876 bgcolor=#fefefe
| 601876 ||  || — || August 20, 2009 || La Sagra || OAM Obs. || MAS || align=right data-sort-value="0.71" | 710 m || 
|-id=877 bgcolor=#fefefe
| 601877 ||  || — || October 25, 2005 || Catalina || CSS || H || align=right data-sort-value="0.77" | 770 m || 
|-id=878 bgcolor=#fefefe
| 601878 ||  || — || November 9, 2013 || Haleakala || Pan-STARRS ||  || align=right | 1.0 km || 
|-id=879 bgcolor=#fefefe
| 601879 ||  || — || November 6, 2013 || Haleakala || Pan-STARRS ||  || align=right | 1.1 km || 
|-id=880 bgcolor=#E9E9E9
| 601880 ||  || — || September 11, 2004 || Socorro || LINEAR || EUN || align=right | 1.4 km || 
|-id=881 bgcolor=#fefefe
| 601881 ||  || — || November 4, 2013 || Kitt Peak || Spacewatch || H || align=right data-sort-value="0.52" | 520 m || 
|-id=882 bgcolor=#E9E9E9
| 601882 ||  || — || November 20, 2009 || Kitt Peak || Spacewatch ||  || align=right data-sort-value="0.77" | 770 m || 
|-id=883 bgcolor=#E9E9E9
| 601883 ||  || — || November 10, 2013 || Mount Lemmon || Mount Lemmon Survey ||  || align=right data-sort-value="0.76" | 760 m || 
|-id=884 bgcolor=#E9E9E9
| 601884 ||  || — || January 18, 2015 || Haleakala || Pan-STARRS ||  || align=right data-sort-value="0.80" | 800 m || 
|-id=885 bgcolor=#E9E9E9
| 601885 ||  || — || June 9, 2016 || Mount Lemmon || Mount Lemmon Survey ||  || align=right data-sort-value="0.72" | 720 m || 
|-id=886 bgcolor=#fefefe
| 601886 ||  || — || November 8, 2013 || Kitt Peak || Spacewatch ||  || align=right data-sort-value="0.65" | 650 m || 
|-id=887 bgcolor=#E9E9E9
| 601887 ||  || — || April 25, 2003 || Kitt Peak || Spacewatch ||  || align=right | 1.5 km || 
|-id=888 bgcolor=#E9E9E9
| 601888 ||  || — || November 6, 2013 || Haleakala || Pan-STARRS ||  || align=right data-sort-value="0.74" | 740 m || 
|-id=889 bgcolor=#E9E9E9
| 601889 ||  || — || November 1, 2013 || Mount Lemmon || Mount Lemmon Survey ||  || align=right data-sort-value="0.69" | 690 m || 
|-id=890 bgcolor=#d6d6d6
| 601890 ||  || — || November 2, 2013 || Mount Lemmon || Mount Lemmon Survey ||  || align=right | 2.1 km || 
|-id=891 bgcolor=#E9E9E9
| 601891 ||  || — || November 9, 2013 || Catalina || CSS ||  || align=right | 1.9 km || 
|-id=892 bgcolor=#fefefe
| 601892 ||  || — || November 1, 2013 || Nogales || M. Schwartz, P. R. Holvorcem || H || align=right data-sort-value="0.73" | 730 m || 
|-id=893 bgcolor=#E9E9E9
| 601893 ||  || — || April 6, 2011 || Mount Lemmon || Mount Lemmon Survey ||  || align=right data-sort-value="0.82" | 820 m || 
|-id=894 bgcolor=#E9E9E9
| 601894 ||  || — || November 14, 2009 || La Palma || O. Vaduvescu, J. Iglesias-Paramo ||  || align=right data-sort-value="0.86" | 860 m || 
|-id=895 bgcolor=#E9E9E9
| 601895 ||  || — || November 27, 2013 || Haleakala || Pan-STARRS ||  || align=right | 1.2 km || 
|-id=896 bgcolor=#fefefe
| 601896 ||  || — || November 12, 2010 || Mount Lemmon || Mount Lemmon Survey || H || align=right data-sort-value="0.70" | 700 m || 
|-id=897 bgcolor=#fefefe
| 601897 ||  || — || November 6, 2013 || Haleakala || Pan-STARRS ||  || align=right data-sort-value="0.72" | 720 m || 
|-id=898 bgcolor=#E9E9E9
| 601898 ||  || — || December 20, 2001 || Apache Point || SDSS Collaboration ||  || align=right | 1.4 km || 
|-id=899 bgcolor=#fefefe
| 601899 ||  || — || November 2, 2013 || Mount Lemmon || Mount Lemmon Survey ||  || align=right data-sort-value="0.72" | 720 m || 
|-id=900 bgcolor=#E9E9E9
| 601900 ||  || — || November 26, 2013 || Haleakala || Pan-STARRS ||  || align=right data-sort-value="0.70" | 700 m || 
|}

601901–602000 

|-bgcolor=#E9E9E9
| 601901 ||  || — || November 27, 2013 || Haleakala || Pan-STARRS ||  || align=right | 2.8 km || 
|-id=902 bgcolor=#fefefe
| 601902 ||  || — || November 9, 2013 || Kitt Peak || Spacewatch || H || align=right data-sort-value="0.64" | 640 m || 
|-id=903 bgcolor=#fefefe
| 601903 ||  || — || November 6, 2013 || Haleakala || Pan-STARRS || H || align=right data-sort-value="0.49" | 490 m || 
|-id=904 bgcolor=#d6d6d6
| 601904 ||  || — || September 19, 2007 || Mount Lemmon || Mount Lemmon Survey ||  || align=right | 2.1 km || 
|-id=905 bgcolor=#fefefe
| 601905 ||  || — || January 2, 2011 || Mount Lemmon || Mount Lemmon Survey ||  || align=right data-sort-value="0.52" | 520 m || 
|-id=906 bgcolor=#fefefe
| 601906 ||  || — || July 3, 2005 || Palomar || NEAT ||  || align=right data-sort-value="0.93" | 930 m || 
|-id=907 bgcolor=#FA8072
| 601907 ||  || — || October 24, 2005 || Palomar || NEAT || H || align=right data-sort-value="0.58" | 580 m || 
|-id=908 bgcolor=#d6d6d6
| 601908 ||  || — || November 26, 2013 || Nogales || M. Schwartz, P. R. Holvorcem ||  || align=right | 3.1 km || 
|-id=909 bgcolor=#d6d6d6
| 601909 ||  || — || November 24, 2008 || Kitt Peak || Spacewatch ||  || align=right | 1.7 km || 
|-id=910 bgcolor=#E9E9E9
| 601910 ||  || — || November 29, 2013 || Haleakala || Pan-STARRS ||  || align=right | 1.3 km || 
|-id=911 bgcolor=#E9E9E9
| 601911 ||  || — || December 14, 2001 || Kitt Peak || Spacewatch ||  || align=right data-sort-value="0.79" | 790 m || 
|-id=912 bgcolor=#fefefe
| 601912 ||  || — || October 4, 2006 || Mount Lemmon || Mount Lemmon Survey ||  || align=right data-sort-value="0.52" | 520 m || 
|-id=913 bgcolor=#E9E9E9
| 601913 ||  || — || May 21, 2012 || Haleakala || Pan-STARRS ||  || align=right data-sort-value="0.86" | 860 m || 
|-id=914 bgcolor=#d6d6d6
| 601914 ||  || — || September 29, 2013 || Mount Lemmon || Mount Lemmon Survey ||  || align=right | 1.9 km || 
|-id=915 bgcolor=#E9E9E9
| 601915 ||  || — || November 28, 2013 || Mount Lemmon || Mount Lemmon Survey ||  || align=right data-sort-value="0.76" | 760 m || 
|-id=916 bgcolor=#E9E9E9
| 601916 Sting ||  ||  || November 28, 2013 || Tincana || M. Żołnowski, M. Kusiak ||  || align=right | 1.3 km || 
|-id=917 bgcolor=#d6d6d6
| 601917 ||  || — || October 14, 2013 || Nogales || M. Schwartz, P. R. Holvorcem ||  || align=right | 2.0 km || 
|-id=918 bgcolor=#E9E9E9
| 601918 ||  || — || October 23, 2012 || Haleakala || Pan-STARRS ||  || align=right | 2.5 km || 
|-id=919 bgcolor=#fefefe
| 601919 ||  || — || November 28, 2013 || Haleakala || Pan-STARRS || H || align=right data-sort-value="0.67" | 670 m || 
|-id=920 bgcolor=#E9E9E9
| 601920 ||  || — || March 17, 2010 || Siding Spring || SSS ||  || align=right | 1.5 km || 
|-id=921 bgcolor=#E9E9E9
| 601921 ||  || — || October 26, 2013 || Mount Lemmon || Mount Lemmon Survey ||  || align=right | 1.2 km || 
|-id=922 bgcolor=#E9E9E9
| 601922 ||  || — || November 27, 2013 || Haleakala || Pan-STARRS ||  || align=right data-sort-value="0.91" | 910 m || 
|-id=923 bgcolor=#E9E9E9
| 601923 ||  || — || November 27, 2013 || Haleakala || Pan-STARRS ||  || align=right data-sort-value="0.62" | 620 m || 
|-id=924 bgcolor=#E9E9E9
| 601924 ||  || — || November 27, 2013 || Haleakala || Pan-STARRS ||  || align=right | 1.0 km || 
|-id=925 bgcolor=#E9E9E9
| 601925 ||  || — || November 28, 2013 || Mount Lemmon || Mount Lemmon Survey ||  || align=right data-sort-value="0.94" | 940 m || 
|-id=926 bgcolor=#E9E9E9
| 601926 ||  || — || November 24, 2013 || Haleakala || Pan-STARRS ||  || align=right data-sort-value="0.83" | 830 m || 
|-id=927 bgcolor=#E9E9E9
| 601927 ||  || — || November 27, 2013 || Haleakala || Pan-STARRS ||  || align=right data-sort-value="0.87" | 870 m || 
|-id=928 bgcolor=#E9E9E9
| 601928 ||  || — || September 18, 2003 || Kitt Peak || Spacewatch ||  || align=right | 2.2 km || 
|-id=929 bgcolor=#E9E9E9
| 601929 ||  || — || November 29, 2013 || Haleakala || Pan-STARRS ||  || align=right | 1.9 km || 
|-id=930 bgcolor=#E9E9E9
| 601930 ||  || — || December 4, 2013 || Haleakala || Pan-STARRS ||  || align=right | 1.1 km || 
|-id=931 bgcolor=#E9E9E9
| 601931 ||  || — || December 4, 2013 || Haleakala || Pan-STARRS ||  || align=right | 1.4 km || 
|-id=932 bgcolor=#fefefe
| 601932 ||  || — || December 3, 2013 || Mount Lemmon || Mount Lemmon Survey ||  || align=right data-sort-value="0.81" | 810 m || 
|-id=933 bgcolor=#fefefe
| 601933 ||  || — || December 12, 2013 || Haleakala || Pan-STARRS || H || align=right data-sort-value="0.51" | 510 m || 
|-id=934 bgcolor=#E9E9E9
| 601934 ||  || — || December 4, 2013 || Haleakala || Pan-STARRS ||  || align=right | 1.2 km || 
|-id=935 bgcolor=#d6d6d6
| 601935 ||  || — || December 13, 2013 || Mount Lemmon || Mount Lemmon Survey ||  || align=right | 2.7 km || 
|-id=936 bgcolor=#E9E9E9
| 601936 ||  || — || December 7, 2013 || Mount Lemmon || Mount Lemmon Survey ||  || align=right | 2.0 km || 
|-id=937 bgcolor=#fefefe
| 601937 ||  || — || December 1, 2013 || XuYi || PMO NEO ||  || align=right data-sort-value="0.54" | 540 m || 
|-id=938 bgcolor=#d6d6d6
| 601938 ||  || — || December 1, 2008 || Kitt Peak || Spacewatch ||  || align=right | 1.9 km || 
|-id=939 bgcolor=#fefefe
| 601939 ||  || — || December 24, 2013 || Mount Lemmon || Mount Lemmon Survey ||  || align=right data-sort-value="0.75" | 750 m || 
|-id=940 bgcolor=#E9E9E9
| 601940 ||  || — || March 11, 2002 || Palomar || NEAT ||  || align=right | 1.1 km || 
|-id=941 bgcolor=#E9E9E9
| 601941 ||  || — || December 23, 2013 || Mount Lemmon || Mount Lemmon Survey ||  || align=right | 1.1 km || 
|-id=942 bgcolor=#d6d6d6
| 601942 ||  || — || August 26, 2012 || Haleakala || Pan-STARRS ||  || align=right | 1.8 km || 
|-id=943 bgcolor=#E9E9E9
| 601943 ||  || — || February 22, 2006 || Palomar || NEAT ||  || align=right | 1.6 km || 
|-id=944 bgcolor=#d6d6d6
| 601944 ||  || — || November 29, 2013 || Haleakala || Pan-STARRS ||  || align=right | 2.4 km || 
|-id=945 bgcolor=#E9E9E9
| 601945 ||  || — || September 21, 2003 || Kitt Peak || Spacewatch ||  || align=right | 1.7 km || 
|-id=946 bgcolor=#E9E9E9
| 601946 ||  || — || May 15, 2002 || Palomar || NEAT ||  || align=right | 2.0 km || 
|-id=947 bgcolor=#E9E9E9
| 601947 ||  || — || August 4, 2008 || Siding Spring || SSS ||  || align=right | 1.2 km || 
|-id=948 bgcolor=#E9E9E9
| 601948 ||  || — || December 4, 2013 || Haleakala || Pan-STARRS ||  || align=right | 1.1 km || 
|-id=949 bgcolor=#E9E9E9
| 601949 ||  || — || October 9, 2012 || Haleakala || Pan-STARRS ||  || align=right | 1.2 km || 
|-id=950 bgcolor=#E9E9E9
| 601950 ||  || — || November 28, 2013 || Mount Lemmon || Mount Lemmon Survey ||  || align=right data-sort-value="0.87" | 870 m || 
|-id=951 bgcolor=#d6d6d6
| 601951 ||  || — || April 25, 2004 || Apache Point || SDSS Collaboration ||  || align=right | 2.9 km || 
|-id=952 bgcolor=#E9E9E9
| 601952 ||  || — || October 10, 2008 || Mount Lemmon || Mount Lemmon Survey ||  || align=right | 1.6 km || 
|-id=953 bgcolor=#E9E9E9
| 601953 ||  || — || September 15, 2012 || Nogales || M. Schwartz, P. R. Holvorcem ||  || align=right | 1.1 km || 
|-id=954 bgcolor=#E9E9E9
| 601954 ||  || — || October 28, 2008 || Mount Lemmon || Mount Lemmon Survey ||  || align=right | 1.1 km || 
|-id=955 bgcolor=#fefefe
| 601955 ||  || — || December 28, 2013 || Kitt Peak || Spacewatch || H || align=right data-sort-value="0.61" | 610 m || 
|-id=956 bgcolor=#E9E9E9
| 601956 ||  || — || August 12, 2012 || Kitt Peak || Spacewatch ||  || align=right data-sort-value="0.87" | 870 m || 
|-id=957 bgcolor=#E9E9E9
| 601957 ||  || — || October 23, 2008 || Kitt Peak || Spacewatch ||  || align=right | 1.1 km || 
|-id=958 bgcolor=#E9E9E9
| 601958 ||  || — || October 8, 2012 || Mount Lemmon || Mount Lemmon Survey ||  || align=right | 1.7 km || 
|-id=959 bgcolor=#E9E9E9
| 601959 ||  || — || December 31, 2013 || Kitt Peak || Spacewatch ||  || align=right | 1.0 km || 
|-id=960 bgcolor=#E9E9E9
| 601960 ||  || — || April 22, 2011 || Kitt Peak || Spacewatch ||  || align=right | 1.7 km || 
|-id=961 bgcolor=#E9E9E9
| 601961 ||  || — || September 28, 2008 || Catalina || CSS ||  || align=right | 2.5 km || 
|-id=962 bgcolor=#d6d6d6
| 601962 ||  || — || July 5, 2005 || Mount Lemmon || Mount Lemmon Survey ||  || align=right | 3.1 km || 
|-id=963 bgcolor=#E9E9E9
| 601963 ||  || — || December 31, 1999 || Kitt Peak || Spacewatch ||  || align=right | 1.6 km || 
|-id=964 bgcolor=#fefefe
| 601964 ||  || — || December 11, 2013 || Haleakala || Pan-STARRS ||  || align=right data-sort-value="0.59" | 590 m || 
|-id=965 bgcolor=#E9E9E9
| 601965 ||  || — || December 30, 2013 || Kitt Peak || Spacewatch ||  || align=right | 1.2 km || 
|-id=966 bgcolor=#E9E9E9
| 601966 ||  || — || February 10, 2010 || Kitt Peak || Spacewatch ||  || align=right data-sort-value="0.85" | 850 m || 
|-id=967 bgcolor=#E9E9E9
| 601967 ||  || — || December 30, 2013 || Kitt Peak || Spacewatch ||  || align=right | 1.4 km || 
|-id=968 bgcolor=#d6d6d6
| 601968 ||  || — || September 24, 2012 || Mount Lemmon || Mount Lemmon Survey ||  || align=right | 2.4 km || 
|-id=969 bgcolor=#E9E9E9
| 601969 ||  || — || December 6, 2013 || Haleakala || Pan-STARRS ||  || align=right data-sort-value="0.92" | 920 m || 
|-id=970 bgcolor=#E9E9E9
| 601970 ||  || — || December 30, 2013 || Mount Lemmon || Mount Lemmon Survey ||  || align=right | 1.5 km || 
|-id=971 bgcolor=#d6d6d6
| 601971 ||  || — || December 31, 2013 || Mount Lemmon || Mount Lemmon Survey ||  || align=right | 2.0 km || 
|-id=972 bgcolor=#d6d6d6
| 601972 ||  || — || December 31, 2013 || Mount Lemmon || Mount Lemmon Survey ||  || align=right | 1.9 km || 
|-id=973 bgcolor=#E9E9E9
| 601973 ||  || — || December 27, 2013 || Kitt Peak || Spacewatch ||  || align=right | 1.5 km || 
|-id=974 bgcolor=#d6d6d6
| 601974 ||  || — || December 31, 2013 || Kitt Peak || Spacewatch ||  || align=right | 2.5 km || 
|-id=975 bgcolor=#E9E9E9
| 601975 ||  || — || February 18, 2005 || La Silla || A. Boattini ||  || align=right | 1.7 km || 
|-id=976 bgcolor=#E9E9E9
| 601976 ||  || — || December 26, 2013 || Kitt Peak || Spacewatch ||  || align=right | 1.2 km || 
|-id=977 bgcolor=#E9E9E9
| 601977 ||  || — || December 31, 2013 || Mount Lemmon || Mount Lemmon Survey ||  || align=right data-sort-value="0.94" | 940 m || 
|-id=978 bgcolor=#fefefe
| 601978 ||  || — || December 25, 2013 || Mount Lemmon || Mount Lemmon Survey ||  || align=right data-sort-value="0.58" | 580 m || 
|-id=979 bgcolor=#d6d6d6
| 601979 ||  || — || December 25, 2013 || Mount Lemmon || Mount Lemmon Survey ||  || align=right | 1.7 km || 
|-id=980 bgcolor=#fefefe
| 601980 ||  || — || January 1, 2014 || Nogales || M. Schwartz, P. R. Holvorcem ||  || align=right data-sort-value="0.64" | 640 m || 
|-id=981 bgcolor=#E9E9E9
| 601981 ||  || — || March 11, 2002 || Palomar || NEAT ||  || align=right | 1.4 km || 
|-id=982 bgcolor=#E9E9E9
| 601982 ||  || — || January 1, 2014 || Haleakala || Pan-STARRS ||  || align=right | 2.0 km || 
|-id=983 bgcolor=#fefefe
| 601983 ||  || — || January 1, 2014 || Mount Lemmon || Mount Lemmon Survey ||  || align=right data-sort-value="0.88" | 880 m || 
|-id=984 bgcolor=#fefefe
| 601984 ||  || — || December 20, 2001 || Kitt Peak || Spacewatch ||  || align=right data-sort-value="0.77" | 770 m || 
|-id=985 bgcolor=#E9E9E9
| 601985 ||  || — || April 11, 2002 || Palomar || NEAT || EUN || align=right | 1.5 km || 
|-id=986 bgcolor=#E9E9E9
| 601986 ||  || — || January 3, 2014 || Oukaimeden || C. Rinner ||  || align=right | 1.0 km || 
|-id=987 bgcolor=#d6d6d6
| 601987 ||  || — || August 26, 2012 || Haleakala || Pan-STARRS ||  || align=right | 2.2 km || 
|-id=988 bgcolor=#E9E9E9
| 601988 ||  || — || December 26, 2013 || Kitt Peak || Spacewatch ||  || align=right data-sort-value="0.82" | 820 m || 
|-id=989 bgcolor=#E9E9E9
| 601989 ||  || — || December 25, 2013 || Kitt Peak || Spacewatch ||  || align=right | 1.2 km || 
|-id=990 bgcolor=#E9E9E9
| 601990 ||  || — || December 31, 2013 || Mount Lemmon || Mount Lemmon Survey ||  || align=right | 2.0 km || 
|-id=991 bgcolor=#fefefe
| 601991 ||  || — || November 6, 2005 || Pla D'Arguines || R. Ferrando, M. Ferrando ||  || align=right data-sort-value="0.95" | 950 m || 
|-id=992 bgcolor=#E9E9E9
| 601992 ||  || — || October 6, 2008 || Mount Lemmon || Mount Lemmon Survey ||  || align=right | 1.3 km || 
|-id=993 bgcolor=#E9E9E9
| 601993 ||  || — || December 24, 2013 || Mount Lemmon || Mount Lemmon Survey ||  || align=right data-sort-value="0.75" | 750 m || 
|-id=994 bgcolor=#E9E9E9
| 601994 ||  || — || March 23, 2006 || Kitt Peak || Spacewatch ||  || align=right | 1.1 km || 
|-id=995 bgcolor=#E9E9E9
| 601995 ||  || — || October 21, 2008 || Kitt Peak || Spacewatch ||  || align=right | 1.0 km || 
|-id=996 bgcolor=#E9E9E9
| 601996 ||  || — || March 15, 2010 || Catalina || CSS ||  || align=right | 2.2 km || 
|-id=997 bgcolor=#E9E9E9
| 601997 ||  || — || October 19, 2003 || Palomar || NEAT ||  || align=right | 2.1 km || 
|-id=998 bgcolor=#d6d6d6
| 601998 ||  || — || December 24, 2013 || Mount Lemmon || Mount Lemmon Survey ||  || align=right | 2.8 km || 
|-id=999 bgcolor=#d6d6d6
| 601999 ||  || — || July 21, 2006 || Mount Lemmon || Mount Lemmon Survey || EOS || align=right | 2.1 km || 
|-id=000 bgcolor=#d6d6d6
| 602000 ||  || — || February 22, 2003 || Palomar || NEAT ||  || align=right | 3.6 km || 
|}

References

External links 
 Discovery Circumstances: Numbered Minor Planets (600001)–(605000) (IAU Minor Planet Center)

0601